

277001–277100 

|-bgcolor=#E9E9E9
| 277001 ||  || — || December 9, 2004 || Catalina || CSS || — || align=right | 1.9 km || 
|-id=002 bgcolor=#E9E9E9
| 277002 ||  || — || December 9, 2004 || Catalina || CSS || WIT || align=right | 1.8 km || 
|-id=003 bgcolor=#E9E9E9
| 277003 ||  || — || December 10, 2004 || Kitt Peak || Spacewatch || — || align=right | 3.6 km || 
|-id=004 bgcolor=#d6d6d6
| 277004 ||  || — || December 10, 2004 || Socorro || LINEAR || — || align=right | 2.8 km || 
|-id=005 bgcolor=#d6d6d6
| 277005 ||  || — || December 11, 2004 || Socorro || LINEAR || — || align=right | 2.6 km || 
|-id=006 bgcolor=#d6d6d6
| 277006 ||  || — || December 12, 2004 || Kitt Peak || Spacewatch || BRA || align=right | 1.9 km || 
|-id=007 bgcolor=#E9E9E9
| 277007 ||  || — || December 14, 2004 || Socorro || LINEAR || — || align=right | 2.5 km || 
|-id=008 bgcolor=#fefefe
| 277008 ||  || — || December 14, 2004 || Campo Imperatore || CINEOS || H || align=right data-sort-value="0.74" | 740 m || 
|-id=009 bgcolor=#E9E9E9
| 277009 ||  || — || December 15, 2004 || Socorro || LINEAR || — || align=right | 2.3 km || 
|-id=010 bgcolor=#E9E9E9
| 277010 ||  || — || December 15, 2004 || Socorro || LINEAR || — || align=right | 1.6 km || 
|-id=011 bgcolor=#d6d6d6
| 277011 ||  || — || December 18, 2004 || Mount Lemmon || Mount Lemmon Survey || — || align=right | 2.6 km || 
|-id=012 bgcolor=#d6d6d6
| 277012 ||  || — || December 18, 2004 || Mount Lemmon || Mount Lemmon Survey || KOR || align=right | 1.4 km || 
|-id=013 bgcolor=#E9E9E9
| 277013 ||  || — || January 6, 2005 || Socorro || LINEAR || — || align=right | 3.9 km || 
|-id=014 bgcolor=#E9E9E9
| 277014 ||  || — || January 6, 2005 || Socorro || LINEAR || WAT || align=right | 2.9 km || 
|-id=015 bgcolor=#d6d6d6
| 277015 ||  || — || January 11, 2005 || Socorro || LINEAR || HYG || align=right | 4.6 km || 
|-id=016 bgcolor=#d6d6d6
| 277016 ||  || — || January 13, 2005 || Kitt Peak || Spacewatch || — || align=right | 3.7 km || 
|-id=017 bgcolor=#E9E9E9
| 277017 ||  || — || January 13, 2005 || Kitt Peak || Spacewatch || — || align=right | 2.8 km || 
|-id=018 bgcolor=#d6d6d6
| 277018 ||  || — || January 15, 2005 || Kitt Peak || Spacewatch || — || align=right | 2.9 km || 
|-id=019 bgcolor=#E9E9E9
| 277019 ||  || — || January 15, 2005 || Catalina || CSS || — || align=right | 4.1 km || 
|-id=020 bgcolor=#d6d6d6
| 277020 ||  || — || January 15, 2005 || Catalina || CSS || — || align=right | 3.7 km || 
|-id=021 bgcolor=#fefefe
| 277021 ||  || — || January 13, 2005 || Kitt Peak || Spacewatch || NYS || align=right data-sort-value="0.74" | 740 m || 
|-id=022 bgcolor=#d6d6d6
| 277022 ||  || — || January 15, 2005 || Kitt Peak || Spacewatch || 615 || align=right | 1.7 km || 
|-id=023 bgcolor=#d6d6d6
| 277023 ||  || — || January 15, 2005 || Kitt Peak || Spacewatch || — || align=right | 3.3 km || 
|-id=024 bgcolor=#d6d6d6
| 277024 ||  || — || January 15, 2005 || Kitt Peak || Spacewatch || — || align=right | 5.3 km || 
|-id=025 bgcolor=#E9E9E9
| 277025 ||  || — || January 16, 2005 || Kitt Peak || Spacewatch || HOF || align=right | 3.7 km || 
|-id=026 bgcolor=#d6d6d6
| 277026 ||  || — || January 16, 2005 || Socorro || LINEAR || — || align=right | 3.7 km || 
|-id=027 bgcolor=#d6d6d6
| 277027 ||  || — || February 1, 2005 || Palomar || NEAT || — || align=right | 3.6 km || 
|-id=028 bgcolor=#d6d6d6
| 277028 ||  || — || February 1, 2005 || Palomar || NEAT || — || align=right | 4.1 km || 
|-id=029 bgcolor=#d6d6d6
| 277029 ||  || — || February 4, 2005 || Wrightwood || J. W. Young || — || align=right | 3.7 km || 
|-id=030 bgcolor=#d6d6d6
| 277030 ||  || — || February 1, 2005 || Kitt Peak || Spacewatch || — || align=right | 2.6 km || 
|-id=031 bgcolor=#d6d6d6
| 277031 ||  || — || February 2, 2005 || Kitt Peak || Spacewatch || — || align=right | 3.8 km || 
|-id=032 bgcolor=#d6d6d6
| 277032 ||  || — || February 2, 2005 || Catalina || CSS || — || align=right | 5.4 km || 
|-id=033 bgcolor=#d6d6d6
| 277033 ||  || — || February 4, 2005 || Palomar || NEAT || — || align=right | 2.6 km || 
|-id=034 bgcolor=#d6d6d6
| 277034 ||  || — || February 1, 2005 || Kitt Peak || Spacewatch || EOS || align=right | 3.6 km || 
|-id=035 bgcolor=#fefefe
| 277035 ||  || — || February 1, 2005 || Kitt Peak || Spacewatch || — || align=right data-sort-value="0.99" | 990 m || 
|-id=036 bgcolor=#E9E9E9
| 277036 ||  || — || February 2, 2005 || Kitt Peak || Spacewatch || — || align=right | 2.0 km || 
|-id=037 bgcolor=#d6d6d6
| 277037 ||  || — || February 7, 2005 || Jonathan B. Postel || Jonathan B. Postel Obs. || — || align=right | 4.4 km || 
|-id=038 bgcolor=#d6d6d6
| 277038 ||  || — || February 9, 2005 || La Silla || A. Boattini, H. Scholl || EOS || align=right | 2.4 km || 
|-id=039 bgcolor=#FFC2E0
| 277039 ||  || — || February 9, 2005 || Mount Lemmon || Mount Lemmon Survey || APO || align=right data-sort-value="0.68" | 680 m || 
|-id=040 bgcolor=#d6d6d6
| 277040 ||  || — || February 2, 2005 || Socorro || LINEAR || EUP || align=right | 5.2 km || 
|-id=041 bgcolor=#E9E9E9
| 277041 ||  || — || February 2, 2005 || Socorro || LINEAR || — || align=right | 2.8 km || 
|-id=042 bgcolor=#fefefe
| 277042 ||  || — || February 4, 2005 || Socorro || LINEAR || FLO || align=right data-sort-value="0.85" | 850 m || 
|-id=043 bgcolor=#d6d6d6
| 277043 ||  || — || February 12, 2005 || Cordell-Lorenz || D. T. Durig || EUP || align=right | 5.1 km || 
|-id=044 bgcolor=#d6d6d6
| 277044 ||  || — || February 9, 2005 || Kitt Peak || Spacewatch || — || align=right | 3.0 km || 
|-id=045 bgcolor=#d6d6d6
| 277045 ||  || — || February 9, 2005 || Campo Imperatore || CINEOS || — || align=right | 3.9 km || 
|-id=046 bgcolor=#d6d6d6
| 277046 ||  || — || February 16, 2005 || La Silla || A. Boattini, H. Scholl || — || align=right | 4.0 km || 
|-id=047 bgcolor=#d6d6d6
| 277047 ||  || — || March 3, 2005 || Kitt Peak || Spacewatch || — || align=right | 3.5 km || 
|-id=048 bgcolor=#d6d6d6
| 277048 ||  || — || March 3, 2005 || Catalina || CSS || — || align=right | 4.6 km || 
|-id=049 bgcolor=#d6d6d6
| 277049 ||  || — || March 3, 2005 || Catalina || CSS || — || align=right | 4.1 km || 
|-id=050 bgcolor=#d6d6d6
| 277050 ||  || — || March 3, 2005 || Socorro || LINEAR || — || align=right | 6.1 km || 
|-id=051 bgcolor=#d6d6d6
| 277051 ||  || — || March 3, 2005 || Kitt Peak || Spacewatch || — || align=right | 2.6 km || 
|-id=052 bgcolor=#fefefe
| 277052 ||  || — || March 2, 2005 || Socorro || LINEAR || H || align=right | 1.3 km || 
|-id=053 bgcolor=#d6d6d6
| 277053 ||  || — || March 4, 2005 || Junk Bond || Junk Bond Obs. || — || align=right | 3.0 km || 
|-id=054 bgcolor=#d6d6d6
| 277054 ||  || — || March 3, 2005 || Catalina || CSS || — || align=right | 3.3 km || 
|-id=055 bgcolor=#d6d6d6
| 277055 ||  || — || March 4, 2005 || Kitt Peak || Spacewatch || — || align=right | 3.0 km || 
|-id=056 bgcolor=#d6d6d6
| 277056 ||  || — || March 4, 2005 || Mount Lemmon || Mount Lemmon Survey || THM || align=right | 2.4 km || 
|-id=057 bgcolor=#d6d6d6
| 277057 ||  || — || March 4, 2005 || Mount Lemmon || Mount Lemmon Survey || EOS || align=right | 2.5 km || 
|-id=058 bgcolor=#d6d6d6
| 277058 ||  || — || March 3, 2005 || Catalina || CSS || — || align=right | 2.7 km || 
|-id=059 bgcolor=#d6d6d6
| 277059 ||  || — || March 3, 2005 || Kitt Peak || Spacewatch || — || align=right | 2.8 km || 
|-id=060 bgcolor=#d6d6d6
| 277060 ||  || — || March 3, 2005 || Catalina || CSS || HYG || align=right | 4.1 km || 
|-id=061 bgcolor=#d6d6d6
| 277061 ||  || — || March 4, 2005 || Kitt Peak || Spacewatch || — || align=right | 3.2 km || 
|-id=062 bgcolor=#d6d6d6
| 277062 ||  || — || March 4, 2005 || Kitt Peak || Spacewatch || — || align=right | 4.1 km || 
|-id=063 bgcolor=#d6d6d6
| 277063 ||  || — || March 4, 2005 || Catalina || CSS || TIR || align=right | 4.6 km || 
|-id=064 bgcolor=#d6d6d6
| 277064 ||  || — || March 4, 2005 || Socorro || LINEAR || — || align=right | 2.8 km || 
|-id=065 bgcolor=#d6d6d6
| 277065 ||  || — || March 8, 2005 || Kitt Peak || Spacewatch || — || align=right | 5.4 km || 
|-id=066 bgcolor=#d6d6d6
| 277066 ||  || — || March 8, 2005 || Socorro || LINEAR || — || align=right | 4.5 km || 
|-id=067 bgcolor=#d6d6d6
| 277067 ||  || — || March 4, 2005 || Catalina || CSS || — || align=right | 3.6 km || 
|-id=068 bgcolor=#d6d6d6
| 277068 ||  || — || March 4, 2005 || Socorro || LINEAR || TIR || align=right | 4.4 km || 
|-id=069 bgcolor=#d6d6d6
| 277069 ||  || — || March 4, 2005 || Socorro || LINEAR || EOS || align=right | 2.3 km || 
|-id=070 bgcolor=#d6d6d6
| 277070 ||  || — || March 4, 2005 || Mount Lemmon || Mount Lemmon Survey || HYG || align=right | 3.2 km || 
|-id=071 bgcolor=#d6d6d6
| 277071 ||  || — || March 7, 2005 || Socorro || LINEAR || — || align=right | 5.3 km || 
|-id=072 bgcolor=#d6d6d6
| 277072 ||  || — || March 9, 2005 || Kitt Peak || Spacewatch || — || align=right | 3.5 km || 
|-id=073 bgcolor=#d6d6d6
| 277073 ||  || — || March 9, 2005 || Catalina || CSS || — || align=right | 2.5 km || 
|-id=074 bgcolor=#d6d6d6
| 277074 ||  || — || March 9, 2005 || Socorro || LINEAR || EOS || align=right | 3.1 km || 
|-id=075 bgcolor=#d6d6d6
| 277075 ||  || — || March 10, 2005 || Catalina || CSS || — || align=right | 4.5 km || 
|-id=076 bgcolor=#d6d6d6
| 277076 ||  || — || March 1, 2005 || Catalina || CSS || — || align=right | 2.8 km || 
|-id=077 bgcolor=#d6d6d6
| 277077 ||  || — || March 9, 2005 || Catalina || CSS || EUP || align=right | 4.8 km || 
|-id=078 bgcolor=#d6d6d6
| 277078 ||  || — || March 9, 2005 || Catalina || CSS || EUP || align=right | 6.3 km || 
|-id=079 bgcolor=#d6d6d6
| 277079 ||  || — || March 9, 2005 || Mount Lemmon || Mount Lemmon Survey || — || align=right | 3.1 km || 
|-id=080 bgcolor=#d6d6d6
| 277080 ||  || — || March 11, 2005 || Kitt Peak || Spacewatch || LIX || align=right | 4.1 km || 
|-id=081 bgcolor=#fefefe
| 277081 ||  || — || March 3, 2005 || Catalina || CSS || H || align=right data-sort-value="0.76" | 760 m || 
|-id=082 bgcolor=#d6d6d6
| 277082 ||  || — || March 8, 2005 || Jarnac || Jarnac Obs. || — || align=right | 3.7 km || 
|-id=083 bgcolor=#d6d6d6
| 277083 ||  || — || March 8, 2005 || Mount Lemmon || Mount Lemmon Survey || EOS || align=right | 2.0 km || 
|-id=084 bgcolor=#d6d6d6
| 277084 ||  || — || March 9, 2005 || Kitt Peak || Spacewatch || — || align=right | 4.7 km || 
|-id=085 bgcolor=#d6d6d6
| 277085 ||  || — || March 10, 2005 || Anderson Mesa || LONEOS || LIX || align=right | 3.9 km || 
|-id=086 bgcolor=#d6d6d6
| 277086 ||  || — || March 8, 2005 || Catalina || CSS || — || align=right | 3.8 km || 
|-id=087 bgcolor=#d6d6d6
| 277087 ||  || — || March 11, 2005 || Kitt Peak || Spacewatch || — || align=right | 3.6 km || 
|-id=088 bgcolor=#d6d6d6
| 277088 ||  || — || March 4, 2005 || Catalina || CSS || — || align=right | 4.5 km || 
|-id=089 bgcolor=#E9E9E9
| 277089 ||  || — || March 8, 2005 || Kitt Peak || Spacewatch || — || align=right | 3.1 km || 
|-id=090 bgcolor=#d6d6d6
| 277090 ||  || — || March 10, 2005 || Catalina || CSS || — || align=right | 4.0 km || 
|-id=091 bgcolor=#d6d6d6
| 277091 ||  || — || March 10, 2005 || Mount Lemmon || Mount Lemmon Survey || — || align=right | 3.1 km || 
|-id=092 bgcolor=#E9E9E9
| 277092 ||  || — || March 11, 2005 || Catalina || CSS || — || align=right | 3.5 km || 
|-id=093 bgcolor=#d6d6d6
| 277093 ||  || — || March 12, 2005 || Socorro || LINEAR || — || align=right | 3.9 km || 
|-id=094 bgcolor=#d6d6d6
| 277094 ||  || — || March 13, 2005 || Kitt Peak || Spacewatch || — || align=right | 3.4 km || 
|-id=095 bgcolor=#d6d6d6
| 277095 ||  || — || March 14, 2005 || Mount Lemmon || Mount Lemmon Survey || EOS || align=right | 3.1 km || 
|-id=096 bgcolor=#d6d6d6
| 277096 ||  || — || March 15, 2005 || Catalina || CSS || — || align=right | 3.3 km || 
|-id=097 bgcolor=#d6d6d6
| 277097 ||  || — || March 3, 2005 || Kitt Peak || Spacewatch || — || align=right | 4.3 km || 
|-id=098 bgcolor=#d6d6d6
| 277098 ||  || — || March 10, 2005 || Catalina || CSS || — || align=right | 5.3 km || 
|-id=099 bgcolor=#d6d6d6
| 277099 ||  || — || March 11, 2005 || Catalina || CSS || — || align=right | 5.4 km || 
|-id=100 bgcolor=#d6d6d6
| 277100 ||  || — || March 7, 2005 || Socorro || LINEAR || — || align=right | 4.3 km || 
|}

277101–277200 

|-bgcolor=#d6d6d6
| 277101 ||  || — || March 8, 2005 || Catalina || CSS || THB || align=right | 3.0 km || 
|-id=102 bgcolor=#d6d6d6
| 277102 ||  || — || March 16, 2005 || Catalina || CSS || — || align=right | 4.2 km || 
|-id=103 bgcolor=#d6d6d6
| 277103 ||  || — || March 30, 2005 || Catalina || CSS || — || align=right | 4.7 km || 
|-id=104 bgcolor=#d6d6d6
| 277104 ||  || — || March 18, 2005 || Catalina || CSS || — || align=right | 4.9 km || 
|-id=105 bgcolor=#d6d6d6
| 277105 ||  || — || March 16, 2005 || Catalina || CSS || VER || align=right | 4.1 km || 
|-id=106 bgcolor=#d6d6d6
| 277106 Forgó || 2005 GY ||  || April 1, 2005 || Piszkéstető || K. Sárneczky || — || align=right | 3.3 km || 
|-id=107 bgcolor=#d6d6d6
| 277107 ||  || — || April 1, 2005 || Ottmarsheim || Ottmarsheim Obs. || — || align=right | 4.3 km || 
|-id=108 bgcolor=#d6d6d6
| 277108 ||  || — || April 1, 2005 || Catalina || CSS || — || align=right | 4.7 km || 
|-id=109 bgcolor=#d6d6d6
| 277109 ||  || — || April 1, 2005 || Kitt Peak || Spacewatch || — || align=right | 5.3 km || 
|-id=110 bgcolor=#d6d6d6
| 277110 ||  || — || April 1, 2005 || Socorro || LINEAR || EUP || align=right | 4.9 km || 
|-id=111 bgcolor=#d6d6d6
| 277111 ||  || — || April 2, 2005 || Mount Lemmon || Mount Lemmon Survey || EOS || align=right | 2.5 km || 
|-id=112 bgcolor=#d6d6d6
| 277112 ||  || — || April 1, 2005 || Anderson Mesa || LONEOS || VER || align=right | 4.4 km || 
|-id=113 bgcolor=#fefefe
| 277113 ||  || — || April 2, 2005 || Mount Lemmon || Mount Lemmon Survey || — || align=right data-sort-value="0.73" | 730 m || 
|-id=114 bgcolor=#d6d6d6
| 277114 ||  || — || April 4, 2005 || Kitt Peak || Spacewatch || — || align=right | 6.0 km || 
|-id=115 bgcolor=#d6d6d6
| 277115 ||  || — || April 4, 2005 || Kitt Peak || Spacewatch || — || align=right | 4.4 km || 
|-id=116 bgcolor=#d6d6d6
| 277116 ||  || — || April 4, 2005 || Catalina || CSS || TIR || align=right | 4.4 km || 
|-id=117 bgcolor=#d6d6d6
| 277117 ||  || — || April 5, 2005 || Mount Lemmon || Mount Lemmon Survey || — || align=right | 3.7 km || 
|-id=118 bgcolor=#d6d6d6
| 277118 ||  || — || April 8, 2005 || Mayhill || A. Lowe || — || align=right | 4.1 km || 
|-id=119 bgcolor=#d6d6d6
| 277119 ||  || — || April 2, 2005 || Mount Lemmon || Mount Lemmon Survey || — || align=right | 4.5 km || 
|-id=120 bgcolor=#d6d6d6
| 277120 ||  || — || April 2, 2005 || Catalina || CSS || — || align=right | 5.5 km || 
|-id=121 bgcolor=#d6d6d6
| 277121 ||  || — || April 2, 2005 || Catalina || CSS || — || align=right | 4.7 km || 
|-id=122 bgcolor=#d6d6d6
| 277122 ||  || — || April 7, 2005 || Kitt Peak || Spacewatch || — || align=right | 4.3 km || 
|-id=123 bgcolor=#d6d6d6
| 277123 ||  || — || April 4, 2005 || Mount Lemmon || Mount Lemmon Survey || THM || align=right | 2.4 km || 
|-id=124 bgcolor=#fefefe
| 277124 ||  || — || April 7, 2005 || Kitt Peak || Spacewatch || — || align=right data-sort-value="0.82" | 820 m || 
|-id=125 bgcolor=#d6d6d6
| 277125 ||  || — || April 10, 2005 || Kitt Peak || Spacewatch || — || align=right | 3.9 km || 
|-id=126 bgcolor=#d6d6d6
| 277126 ||  || — || April 9, 2005 || Siding Spring || SSS || — || align=right | 4.6 km || 
|-id=127 bgcolor=#FFC2E0
| 277127 ||  || — || April 10, 2005 || Mount Lemmon || Mount Lemmon Survey || AMO || align=right data-sort-value="0.66" | 660 m || 
|-id=128 bgcolor=#d6d6d6
| 277128 ||  || — || April 12, 2005 || Anderson Mesa || LONEOS || — || align=right | 3.2 km || 
|-id=129 bgcolor=#d6d6d6
| 277129 ||  || — || April 10, 2005 || Kitt Peak || Spacewatch || — || align=right | 3.1 km || 
|-id=130 bgcolor=#d6d6d6
| 277130 ||  || — || April 13, 2005 || Catalina || CSS || — || align=right | 5.0 km || 
|-id=131 bgcolor=#d6d6d6
| 277131 ||  || — || April 10, 2005 || Kitt Peak || M. W. Buie || — || align=right | 3.9 km || 
|-id=132 bgcolor=#d6d6d6
| 277132 ||  || — || April 10, 2005 || Catalina || CSS || — || align=right | 5.1 km || 
|-id=133 bgcolor=#fefefe
| 277133 ||  || — || April 2, 2005 || Mount Lemmon || Mount Lemmon Survey || NYS || align=right data-sort-value="0.81" | 810 m || 
|-id=134 bgcolor=#d6d6d6
| 277134 ||  || — || May 4, 2005 || Kitt Peak || Spacewatch || 7:4 || align=right | 4.9 km || 
|-id=135 bgcolor=#d6d6d6
| 277135 ||  || — || May 2, 2005 || Kitt Peak || Spacewatch || TIR || align=right | 3.3 km || 
|-id=136 bgcolor=#d6d6d6
| 277136 ||  || — || May 9, 2005 || Socorro || LINEAR || — || align=right | 3.8 km || 
|-id=137 bgcolor=#E9E9E9
| 277137 ||  || — || May 10, 2005 || Kitt Peak || Spacewatch || JUN || align=right | 1.1 km || 
|-id=138 bgcolor=#d6d6d6
| 277138 ||  || — || May 13, 2005 || Kitt Peak || Spacewatch || HYG || align=right | 3.6 km || 
|-id=139 bgcolor=#E9E9E9
| 277139 ||  || — || May 28, 2005 || Reedy Creek || J. Broughton || EUN || align=right | 1.6 km || 
|-id=140 bgcolor=#fefefe
| 277140 ||  || — || May 19, 2005 || Mount Lemmon || Mount Lemmon Survey || — || align=right data-sort-value="0.94" | 940 m || 
|-id=141 bgcolor=#d6d6d6
| 277141 ||  || — || June 4, 2005 || Socorro || LINEAR || — || align=right | 5.2 km || 
|-id=142 bgcolor=#FFC2E0
| 277142 ||  || — || June 7, 2005 || Catalina || CSS || APO +1km || align=right | 1.5 km || 
|-id=143 bgcolor=#fefefe
| 277143 ||  || — || June 12, 2005 || Kitt Peak || Spacewatch || — || align=right | 2.5 km || 
|-id=144 bgcolor=#d6d6d6
| 277144 ||  || — || June 9, 2005 || Kitt Peak || Spacewatch || — || align=right | 4.1 km || 
|-id=145 bgcolor=#fefefe
| 277145 ||  || — || June 11, 2005 || Kitt Peak || Spacewatch || — || align=right data-sort-value="0.78" | 780 m || 
|-id=146 bgcolor=#fefefe
| 277146 ||  || — || June 11, 2005 || Kitt Peak || Spacewatch || — || align=right data-sort-value="0.80" | 800 m || 
|-id=147 bgcolor=#fefefe
| 277147 ||  || — || June 17, 2005 || Mount Lemmon || Mount Lemmon Survey || — || align=right | 1.1 km || 
|-id=148 bgcolor=#fefefe
| 277148 ||  || — || June 18, 2005 || Mount Lemmon || Mount Lemmon Survey || — || align=right | 1.2 km || 
|-id=149 bgcolor=#fefefe
| 277149 ||  || — || June 28, 2005 || Kitt Peak || Spacewatch || — || align=right | 1.1 km || 
|-id=150 bgcolor=#fefefe
| 277150 ||  || — || June 28, 2005 || Kitt Peak || Spacewatch || — || align=right | 1.3 km || 
|-id=151 bgcolor=#fefefe
| 277151 ||  || — || June 28, 2005 || Palomar || NEAT || — || align=right data-sort-value="0.76" | 760 m || 
|-id=152 bgcolor=#fefefe
| 277152 ||  || — || June 29, 2005 || Kitt Peak || Spacewatch || FLO || align=right data-sort-value="0.77" | 770 m || 
|-id=153 bgcolor=#fefefe
| 277153 ||  || — || June 28, 2005 || Kitt Peak || Spacewatch || V || align=right data-sort-value="0.79" | 790 m || 
|-id=154 bgcolor=#fefefe
| 277154 ||  || — || June 28, 2005 || Palomar || NEAT || — || align=right data-sort-value="0.70" | 700 m || 
|-id=155 bgcolor=#fefefe
| 277155 ||  || — || June 28, 2005 || Palomar || NEAT || V || align=right data-sort-value="0.76" | 760 m || 
|-id=156 bgcolor=#fefefe
| 277156 ||  || — || June 29, 2005 || Kitt Peak || Spacewatch || — || align=right | 1.1 km || 
|-id=157 bgcolor=#fefefe
| 277157 ||  || — || June 30, 2005 || Kitt Peak || Spacewatch || — || align=right | 1.00 km || 
|-id=158 bgcolor=#fefefe
| 277158 ||  || — || June 28, 2005 || Palomar || NEAT || ERI || align=right | 1.7 km || 
|-id=159 bgcolor=#fefefe
| 277159 ||  || — || June 30, 2005 || Kitt Peak || Spacewatch || — || align=right | 1.1 km || 
|-id=160 bgcolor=#fefefe
| 277160 ||  || — || June 29, 2005 || Kitt Peak || Spacewatch || V || align=right data-sort-value="0.59" | 590 m || 
|-id=161 bgcolor=#E9E9E9
| 277161 ||  || — || June 28, 2005 || Kitt Peak || Spacewatch || — || align=right | 2.2 km || 
|-id=162 bgcolor=#FA8072
| 277162 ||  || — || July 5, 2005 || Socorro || LINEAR || — || align=right | 1.8 km || 
|-id=163 bgcolor=#E9E9E9
| 277163 ||  || — || July 7, 2005 || Kitt Peak || Spacewatch || HNA || align=right | 1.9 km || 
|-id=164 bgcolor=#fefefe
| 277164 ||  || — || July 10, 2005 || Kitt Peak || Spacewatch || — || align=right data-sort-value="0.97" | 970 m || 
|-id=165 bgcolor=#fefefe
| 277165 ||  || — || July 9, 2005 || Kitt Peak || Spacewatch || V || align=right data-sort-value="0.84" | 840 m || 
|-id=166 bgcolor=#fefefe
| 277166 ||  || — || July 10, 2005 || Catalina || CSS || — || align=right | 1.3 km || 
|-id=167 bgcolor=#fefefe
| 277167 ||  || — || July 4, 2005 || Mount Lemmon || Mount Lemmon Survey || MAS || align=right data-sort-value="0.81" | 810 m || 
|-id=168 bgcolor=#fefefe
| 277168 ||  || — || July 5, 2005 || Palomar || NEAT || — || align=right | 1.0 km || 
|-id=169 bgcolor=#fefefe
| 277169 ||  || — || July 2, 2005 || Kitt Peak || Spacewatch || V || align=right data-sort-value="0.80" | 800 m || 
|-id=170 bgcolor=#fefefe
| 277170 ||  || — || July 11, 2005 || Mount Lemmon || Mount Lemmon Survey || — || align=right data-sort-value="0.85" | 850 m || 
|-id=171 bgcolor=#E9E9E9
| 277171 ||  || — || July 15, 2005 || Kitt Peak || Spacewatch || AGN || align=right | 1.4 km || 
|-id=172 bgcolor=#FA8072
| 277172 ||  || — || July 16, 2005 || Anderson Mesa || LONEOS || — || align=right data-sort-value="0.93" | 930 m || 
|-id=173 bgcolor=#fefefe
| 277173 ||  || — || July 16, 2005 || Reedy Creek || J. Broughton || — || align=right data-sort-value="0.96" | 960 m || 
|-id=174 bgcolor=#fefefe
| 277174 ||  || — || July 27, 2005 || Palomar || NEAT || — || align=right | 1.2 km || 
|-id=175 bgcolor=#FA8072
| 277175 ||  || — || July 31, 2005 || Siding Spring || SSS || — || align=right data-sort-value="0.94" | 940 m || 
|-id=176 bgcolor=#fefefe
| 277176 ||  || — || July 30, 2005 || Palomar || NEAT || FLO || align=right data-sort-value="0.77" | 770 m || 
|-id=177 bgcolor=#fefefe
| 277177 ||  || — || July 29, 2005 || Reedy Creek || J. Broughton || V || align=right data-sort-value="0.78" | 780 m || 
|-id=178 bgcolor=#fefefe
| 277178 ||  || — || July 31, 2005 || Palomar || NEAT || NYS || align=right data-sort-value="0.75" | 750 m || 
|-id=179 bgcolor=#d6d6d6
| 277179 ||  || — || July 18, 2005 || Palomar || NEAT || 3:2 || align=right | 5.2 km || 
|-id=180 bgcolor=#fefefe
| 277180 ||  || — || July 31, 2005 || Palomar || NEAT || V || align=right data-sort-value="0.68" | 680 m || 
|-id=181 bgcolor=#fefefe
| 277181 ||  || — || August 1, 2005 || Siding Spring || SSS || — || align=right | 1.6 km || 
|-id=182 bgcolor=#fefefe
| 277182 ||  || — || August 1, 2005 || Siding Spring || SSS || V || align=right data-sort-value="0.82" | 820 m || 
|-id=183 bgcolor=#fefefe
| 277183 ||  || — || August 4, 2005 || Palomar || NEAT || — || align=right | 1.0 km || 
|-id=184 bgcolor=#fefefe
| 277184 ||  || — || June 17, 2005 || Mount Lemmon || Mount Lemmon Survey || — || align=right | 1.0 km || 
|-id=185 bgcolor=#fefefe
| 277185 ||  || — || August 24, 2005 || Palomar || NEAT || FLO || align=right data-sort-value="0.67" | 670 m || 
|-id=186 bgcolor=#fefefe
| 277186 ||  || — || August 24, 2005 || Palomar || NEAT || — || align=right data-sort-value="0.94" | 940 m || 
|-id=187 bgcolor=#fefefe
| 277187 ||  || — || August 26, 2005 || Anderson Mesa || LONEOS || FLO || align=right data-sort-value="0.86" | 860 m || 
|-id=188 bgcolor=#fefefe
| 277188 ||  || — || August 27, 2005 || Anderson Mesa || LONEOS || — || align=right | 1.1 km || 
|-id=189 bgcolor=#fefefe
| 277189 ||  || — || August 22, 2005 || Palomar || NEAT || — || align=right | 1.3 km || 
|-id=190 bgcolor=#fefefe
| 277190 ||  || — || August 24, 2005 || Palomar || NEAT || — || align=right | 1.0 km || 
|-id=191 bgcolor=#fefefe
| 277191 ||  || — || August 24, 2005 || Palomar || NEAT || — || align=right data-sort-value="0.86" | 860 m || 
|-id=192 bgcolor=#fefefe
| 277192 ||  || — || August 25, 2005 || Palomar || NEAT || — || align=right | 1.1 km || 
|-id=193 bgcolor=#fefefe
| 277193 ||  || — || August 25, 2005 || Palomar || NEAT || FLO || align=right data-sort-value="0.72" | 720 m || 
|-id=194 bgcolor=#fefefe
| 277194 ||  || — || August 26, 2005 || Haleakala || NEAT || — || align=right | 1.1 km || 
|-id=195 bgcolor=#fefefe
| 277195 ||  || — || August 26, 2005 || Palomar || NEAT || — || align=right data-sort-value="0.88" | 880 m || 
|-id=196 bgcolor=#fefefe
| 277196 ||  || — || August 26, 2005 || Palomar || NEAT || ERI || align=right | 2.7 km || 
|-id=197 bgcolor=#fefefe
| 277197 ||  || — || August 26, 2005 || Palomar || NEAT || — || align=right | 1.0 km || 
|-id=198 bgcolor=#fefefe
| 277198 ||  || — || August 28, 2005 || Kitt Peak || Spacewatch || — || align=right data-sort-value="0.90" | 900 m || 
|-id=199 bgcolor=#fefefe
| 277199 ||  || — || August 28, 2005 || Siding Spring || SSS || FLO || align=right data-sort-value="0.75" | 750 m || 
|-id=200 bgcolor=#fefefe
| 277200 ||  || — || August 29, 2005 || Socorro || LINEAR || FLO || align=right data-sort-value="0.87" | 870 m || 
|}

277201–277300 

|-bgcolor=#fefefe
| 277201 ||  || — || August 29, 2005 || Kitt Peak || Spacewatch || FLO || align=right data-sort-value="0.86" | 860 m || 
|-id=202 bgcolor=#fefefe
| 277202 ||  || — || August 25, 2005 || Palomar || NEAT || V || align=right data-sort-value="0.81" | 810 m || 
|-id=203 bgcolor=#fefefe
| 277203 ||  || — || August 30, 2005 || Kitt Peak || Spacewatch || — || align=right | 1.5 km || 
|-id=204 bgcolor=#E9E9E9
| 277204 ||  || — || August 30, 2005 || Saint-Véran || Saint-Véran Obs. || — || align=right | 1.2 km || 
|-id=205 bgcolor=#fefefe
| 277205 ||  || — || August 26, 2005 || Anderson Mesa || LONEOS || — || align=right data-sort-value="0.97" | 970 m || 
|-id=206 bgcolor=#fefefe
| 277206 ||  || — || August 26, 2005 || Palomar || NEAT || NYS || align=right data-sort-value="0.89" | 890 m || 
|-id=207 bgcolor=#fefefe
| 277207 ||  || — || August 27, 2005 || Palomar || NEAT || — || align=right data-sort-value="0.87" | 870 m || 
|-id=208 bgcolor=#fefefe
| 277208 ||  || — || July 29, 2005 || Palomar || NEAT || FLO || align=right data-sort-value="0.70" | 700 m || 
|-id=209 bgcolor=#fefefe
| 277209 ||  || — || August 27, 2005 || Palomar || NEAT || NYS || align=right | 2.0 km || 
|-id=210 bgcolor=#fefefe
| 277210 ||  || — || August 28, 2005 || Kitt Peak || Spacewatch || ERI || align=right | 2.0 km || 
|-id=211 bgcolor=#fefefe
| 277211 ||  || — || August 28, 2005 || Kitt Peak || Spacewatch || V || align=right data-sort-value="0.71" | 710 m || 
|-id=212 bgcolor=#d6d6d6
| 277212 ||  || — || August 28, 2005 || Kitt Peak || Spacewatch || CHA || align=right | 2.3 km || 
|-id=213 bgcolor=#E9E9E9
| 277213 ||  || — || August 28, 2005 || Kitt Peak || Spacewatch || — || align=right | 1.0 km || 
|-id=214 bgcolor=#fefefe
| 277214 ||  || — || August 28, 2005 || Kitt Peak || Spacewatch || — || align=right data-sort-value="0.87" | 870 m || 
|-id=215 bgcolor=#fefefe
| 277215 ||  || — || August 28, 2005 || Kitt Peak || Spacewatch || — || align=right data-sort-value="0.90" | 900 m || 
|-id=216 bgcolor=#fefefe
| 277216 ||  || — || August 28, 2005 || Kitt Peak || Spacewatch || MAS || align=right data-sort-value="0.86" | 860 m || 
|-id=217 bgcolor=#fefefe
| 277217 ||  || — || August 31, 2005 || Goodricke-Pigott || R. A. Tucker || — || align=right data-sort-value="0.94" | 940 m || 
|-id=218 bgcolor=#fefefe
| 277218 ||  || — || August 28, 2005 || Siding Spring || SSS || — || align=right | 1.3 km || 
|-id=219 bgcolor=#fefefe
| 277219 ||  || — || August 30, 2005 || Kitt Peak || Spacewatch || MAS || align=right data-sort-value="0.74" | 740 m || 
|-id=220 bgcolor=#d6d6d6
| 277220 ||  || — || August 30, 2005 || Palomar || NEAT || 3:2 || align=right | 6.8 km || 
|-id=221 bgcolor=#fefefe
| 277221 ||  || — || August 27, 2005 || Kitt Peak || Spacewatch || ERI || align=right | 2.4 km || 
|-id=222 bgcolor=#fefefe
| 277222 ||  || — || August 28, 2005 || Anderson Mesa || LONEOS || — || align=right | 1.3 km || 
|-id=223 bgcolor=#fefefe
| 277223 ||  || — || August 30, 2005 || Palomar || NEAT || FLO || align=right | 2.1 km || 
|-id=224 bgcolor=#fefefe
| 277224 ||  || — || August 31, 2005 || Palomar || NEAT || MAS || align=right data-sort-value="0.96" | 960 m || 
|-id=225 bgcolor=#fefefe
| 277225 ||  || — || August 31, 2005 || Palomar || NEAT || FLO || align=right data-sort-value="0.86" | 860 m || 
|-id=226 bgcolor=#fefefe
| 277226 ||  || — || August 27, 2005 || Anderson Mesa || LONEOS || — || align=right | 2.7 km || 
|-id=227 bgcolor=#fefefe
| 277227 ||  || — || August 29, 2005 || Palomar || NEAT || V || align=right data-sort-value="0.96" | 960 m || 
|-id=228 bgcolor=#fefefe
| 277228 ||  || — || August 29, 2005 || Palomar || NEAT || — || align=right data-sort-value="0.92" | 920 m || 
|-id=229 bgcolor=#fefefe
| 277229 ||  || — || August 29, 2005 || Palomar || NEAT || FLO || align=right data-sort-value="0.87" | 870 m || 
|-id=230 bgcolor=#fefefe
| 277230 ||  || — || August 26, 2005 || Palomar || NEAT || — || align=right | 1.1 km || 
|-id=231 bgcolor=#fefefe
| 277231 ||  || — || August 30, 2005 || Palomar || NEAT || — || align=right | 1.1 km || 
|-id=232 bgcolor=#fefefe
| 277232 ||  || — || August 30, 2005 || Kitt Peak || Spacewatch || — || align=right | 1.0 km || 
|-id=233 bgcolor=#fefefe
| 277233 ||  || — || August 31, 2005 || Palomar || NEAT || — || align=right | 1.1 km || 
|-id=234 bgcolor=#fefefe
| 277234 ||  || — || August 29, 2005 || Kitt Peak || Spacewatch || NYS || align=right data-sort-value="0.79" | 790 m || 
|-id=235 bgcolor=#fefefe
| 277235 ||  || — || August 29, 2005 || Kitt Peak || Spacewatch || — || align=right data-sort-value="0.90" | 900 m || 
|-id=236 bgcolor=#fefefe
| 277236 ||  || — || September 1, 2005 || Palomar || NEAT || NYS || align=right | 2.8 km || 
|-id=237 bgcolor=#fefefe
| 277237 ||  || — || September 6, 2005 || Anderson Mesa || LONEOS || — || align=right | 1.1 km || 
|-id=238 bgcolor=#FA8072
| 277238 ||  || — || September 8, 2005 || Socorro || LINEAR || — || align=right | 1.7 km || 
|-id=239 bgcolor=#fefefe
| 277239 ||  || — || September 8, 2005 || Siding Spring || SSS || — || align=right | 1.0 km || 
|-id=240 bgcolor=#fefefe
| 277240 ||  || — || September 1, 2005 || Kitt Peak || Spacewatch || V || align=right data-sort-value="0.63" | 630 m || 
|-id=241 bgcolor=#fefefe
| 277241 ||  || — || September 1, 2005 || Kitt Peak || Spacewatch || V || align=right data-sort-value="0.68" | 680 m || 
|-id=242 bgcolor=#fefefe
| 277242 ||  || — || September 1, 2005 || Kitt Peak || Spacewatch || MAS || align=right data-sort-value="0.86" | 860 m || 
|-id=243 bgcolor=#fefefe
| 277243 ||  || — || September 10, 2005 || Anderson Mesa || LONEOS || V || align=right data-sort-value="0.80" | 800 m || 
|-id=244 bgcolor=#fefefe
| 277244 ||  || — || September 10, 2005 || Anderson Mesa || LONEOS || — || align=right | 2.2 km || 
|-id=245 bgcolor=#fefefe
| 277245 ||  || — || September 6, 2005 || Catalina || CSS || — || align=right | 1.5 km || 
|-id=246 bgcolor=#fefefe
| 277246 ||  || — || September 11, 2005 || Anderson Mesa || LONEOS || FLO || align=right | 1.1 km || 
|-id=247 bgcolor=#fefefe
| 277247 ||  || — || September 9, 2005 || Socorro || LINEAR || — || align=right | 1.3 km || 
|-id=248 bgcolor=#E9E9E9
| 277248 ||  || — || September 9, 2005 || Socorro || LINEAR || — || align=right | 3.4 km || 
|-id=249 bgcolor=#E9E9E9
| 277249 ||  || — || September 11, 2005 || Anderson Mesa || LONEOS || JUN || align=right | 1.3 km || 
|-id=250 bgcolor=#fefefe
| 277250 ||  || — || September 13, 2005 || Kitt Peak || Spacewatch || MAS || align=right data-sort-value="0.77" | 770 m || 
|-id=251 bgcolor=#d6d6d6
| 277251 ||  || — || September 3, 2005 || Catalina || CSS || HIL3:2 || align=right | 7.5 km || 
|-id=252 bgcolor=#fefefe
| 277252 ||  || — || September 3, 2005 || Catalina || CSS || V || align=right data-sort-value="0.87" | 870 m || 
|-id=253 bgcolor=#fefefe
| 277253 ||  || — || September 14, 2005 || Apache Point || A. C. Becker || V || align=right data-sort-value="0.71" | 710 m || 
|-id=254 bgcolor=#fefefe
| 277254 ||  || — || September 14, 2005 || Apache Point || A. C. Becker || V || align=right data-sort-value="0.68" | 680 m || 
|-id=255 bgcolor=#fefefe
| 277255 ||  || — || September 23, 2005 || Catalina || CSS || — || align=right | 1.3 km || 
|-id=256 bgcolor=#fefefe
| 277256 ||  || — || September 23, 2005 || Catalina || CSS || V || align=right data-sort-value="0.84" | 840 m || 
|-id=257 bgcolor=#d6d6d6
| 277257 ||  || — || September 23, 2005 || Kitt Peak || Spacewatch || — || align=right | 3.4 km || 
|-id=258 bgcolor=#fefefe
| 277258 ||  || — || September 23, 2005 || Anderson Mesa || LONEOS || — || align=right | 1.0 km || 
|-id=259 bgcolor=#fefefe
| 277259 ||  || — || September 24, 2005 || Kitt Peak || Spacewatch || — || align=right data-sort-value="0.98" | 980 m || 
|-id=260 bgcolor=#fefefe
| 277260 ||  || — || September 26, 2005 || Kitt Peak || Spacewatch || — || align=right data-sort-value="0.75" | 750 m || 
|-id=261 bgcolor=#fefefe
| 277261 ||  || — || September 25, 2005 || Kitt Peak || Spacewatch || V || align=right data-sort-value="0.85" | 850 m || 
|-id=262 bgcolor=#fefefe
| 277262 ||  || — || September 28, 2005 || Ondřejov || P. Kušnirák || — || align=right | 2.4 km || 
|-id=263 bgcolor=#fefefe
| 277263 ||  || — || September 23, 2005 || Kitt Peak || Spacewatch || — || align=right data-sort-value="0.90" | 900 m || 
|-id=264 bgcolor=#fefefe
| 277264 ||  || — || September 23, 2005 || Kitt Peak || Spacewatch || FLO || align=right data-sort-value="0.82" | 820 m || 
|-id=265 bgcolor=#fefefe
| 277265 ||  || — || September 23, 2005 || Kitt Peak || Spacewatch || — || align=right | 1.1 km || 
|-id=266 bgcolor=#fefefe
| 277266 ||  || — || September 24, 2005 || Kitt Peak || Spacewatch || FLO || align=right data-sort-value="0.67" | 670 m || 
|-id=267 bgcolor=#E9E9E9
| 277267 ||  || — || September 24, 2005 || Kitt Peak || Spacewatch || — || align=right data-sort-value="0.87" | 870 m || 
|-id=268 bgcolor=#fefefe
| 277268 ||  || — || September 24, 2005 || Kitt Peak || Spacewatch || FLO || align=right data-sort-value="0.74" | 740 m || 
|-id=269 bgcolor=#fefefe
| 277269 ||  || — || September 25, 2005 || Catalina || CSS || FLO || align=right data-sort-value="0.65" | 650 m || 
|-id=270 bgcolor=#fefefe
| 277270 ||  || — || September 25, 2005 || Kitt Peak || Spacewatch || NYS || align=right data-sort-value="0.73" | 730 m || 
|-id=271 bgcolor=#E9E9E9
| 277271 ||  || — || September 26, 2005 || Goodricke-Pigott || R. A. Tucker || — || align=right | 1.1 km || 
|-id=272 bgcolor=#fefefe
| 277272 ||  || — || September 26, 2005 || Kitt Peak || Spacewatch || NYS || align=right data-sort-value="0.72" | 720 m || 
|-id=273 bgcolor=#d6d6d6
| 277273 ||  || — || September 26, 2005 || Kitt Peak || Spacewatch || — || align=right | 3.5 km || 
|-id=274 bgcolor=#fefefe
| 277274 ||  || — || September 26, 2005 || Palomar || NEAT || — || align=right | 1.2 km || 
|-id=275 bgcolor=#fefefe
| 277275 ||  || — || September 27, 2005 || Kitt Peak || Spacewatch || NYS || align=right data-sort-value="0.67" | 670 m || 
|-id=276 bgcolor=#fefefe
| 277276 ||  || — || September 27, 2005 || Kitt Peak || Spacewatch || — || align=right | 1.0 km || 
|-id=277 bgcolor=#fefefe
| 277277 ||  || — || September 27, 2005 || Kitt Peak || Spacewatch || NYS || align=right data-sort-value="0.85" | 850 m || 
|-id=278 bgcolor=#fefefe
| 277278 ||  || — || September 27, 2005 || Kitt Peak || Spacewatch || — || align=right data-sort-value="0.96" | 960 m || 
|-id=279 bgcolor=#FFC2E0
| 277279 ||  || — || September 30, 2005 || Socorro || LINEAR || AMO || align=right data-sort-value="0.63" | 630 m || 
|-id=280 bgcolor=#fefefe
| 277280 ||  || — || September 24, 2005 || Kitt Peak || Spacewatch || V || align=right data-sort-value="0.78" | 780 m || 
|-id=281 bgcolor=#fefefe
| 277281 ||  || — || September 24, 2005 || Kitt Peak || Spacewatch || V || align=right data-sort-value="0.84" | 840 m || 
|-id=282 bgcolor=#fefefe
| 277282 ||  || — || September 24, 2005 || Kitt Peak || Spacewatch || — || align=right data-sort-value="0.91" | 910 m || 
|-id=283 bgcolor=#fefefe
| 277283 ||  || — || September 24, 2005 || Kitt Peak || Spacewatch || NYS || align=right data-sort-value="0.68" | 680 m || 
|-id=284 bgcolor=#fefefe
| 277284 ||  || — || September 24, 2005 || Kitt Peak || Spacewatch || — || align=right data-sort-value="0.85" | 850 m || 
|-id=285 bgcolor=#fefefe
| 277285 ||  || — || September 24, 2005 || Kitt Peak || Spacewatch || — || align=right | 1.0 km || 
|-id=286 bgcolor=#d6d6d6
| 277286 ||  || — || September 24, 2005 || Kitt Peak || Spacewatch || — || align=right | 3.2 km || 
|-id=287 bgcolor=#fefefe
| 277287 ||  || — || September 24, 2005 || Anderson Mesa || LONEOS || FLO || align=right data-sort-value="0.97" | 970 m || 
|-id=288 bgcolor=#fefefe
| 277288 ||  || — || September 24, 2005 || Kitt Peak || Spacewatch || ERI || align=right | 1.6 km || 
|-id=289 bgcolor=#fefefe
| 277289 ||  || — || September 25, 2005 || Kitt Peak || Spacewatch || — || align=right data-sort-value="0.86" | 860 m || 
|-id=290 bgcolor=#fefefe
| 277290 ||  || — || September 25, 2005 || Kitt Peak || Spacewatch || NYS || align=right data-sort-value="0.92" | 920 m || 
|-id=291 bgcolor=#d6d6d6
| 277291 ||  || — || September 25, 2005 || Kitt Peak || Spacewatch || — || align=right | 4.8 km || 
|-id=292 bgcolor=#fefefe
| 277292 ||  || — || September 25, 2005 || Palomar || NEAT || — || align=right | 1.8 km || 
|-id=293 bgcolor=#fefefe
| 277293 ||  || — || September 26, 2005 || Kitt Peak || Spacewatch || MAS || align=right data-sort-value="0.82" | 820 m || 
|-id=294 bgcolor=#fefefe
| 277294 ||  || — || September 26, 2005 || Catalina || CSS || — || align=right | 3.8 km || 
|-id=295 bgcolor=#fefefe
| 277295 ||  || — || September 29, 2005 || Anderson Mesa || LONEOS || V || align=right data-sort-value="0.97" | 970 m || 
|-id=296 bgcolor=#fefefe
| 277296 ||  || — || September 29, 2005 || Palomar || NEAT || — || align=right data-sort-value="0.94" | 940 m || 
|-id=297 bgcolor=#fefefe
| 277297 ||  || — || September 29, 2005 || Mount Lemmon || Mount Lemmon Survey || EUT || align=right data-sort-value="0.73" | 730 m || 
|-id=298 bgcolor=#fefefe
| 277298 ||  || — || September 29, 2005 || Palomar || NEAT || V || align=right data-sort-value="0.92" | 920 m || 
|-id=299 bgcolor=#E9E9E9
| 277299 ||  || — || September 29, 2005 || Kitt Peak || Spacewatch || — || align=right | 1.1 km || 
|-id=300 bgcolor=#fefefe
| 277300 ||  || — || September 25, 2005 || Kitt Peak || Spacewatch || — || align=right | 1.5 km || 
|}

277301–277400 

|-bgcolor=#fefefe
| 277301 ||  || — || September 25, 2005 || Kitt Peak || Spacewatch || — || align=right | 1.1 km || 
|-id=302 bgcolor=#fefefe
| 277302 ||  || — || September 25, 2005 || Kitt Peak || Spacewatch || V || align=right data-sort-value="0.80" | 800 m || 
|-id=303 bgcolor=#fefefe
| 277303 ||  || — || September 25, 2005 || Kitt Peak || Spacewatch || — || align=right | 1.0 km || 
|-id=304 bgcolor=#fefefe
| 277304 ||  || — || September 25, 2005 || Palomar || NEAT || — || align=right | 1.0 km || 
|-id=305 bgcolor=#fefefe
| 277305 ||  || — || September 25, 2005 || Kitt Peak || Spacewatch || NYS || align=right data-sort-value="0.77" | 770 m || 
|-id=306 bgcolor=#fefefe
| 277306 ||  || — || September 26, 2005 || Kitt Peak || Spacewatch || — || align=right | 1.1 km || 
|-id=307 bgcolor=#FA8072
| 277307 ||  || — || September 27, 2005 || Palomar || NEAT || — || align=right | 1.3 km || 
|-id=308 bgcolor=#E9E9E9
| 277308 ||  || — || September 29, 2005 || Kitt Peak || Spacewatch || — || align=right | 1.3 km || 
|-id=309 bgcolor=#E9E9E9
| 277309 ||  || — || September 29, 2005 || Kitt Peak || Spacewatch || — || align=right data-sort-value="0.88" | 880 m || 
|-id=310 bgcolor=#fefefe
| 277310 ||  || — || September 29, 2005 || Kitt Peak || Spacewatch || — || align=right data-sort-value="0.87" | 870 m || 
|-id=311 bgcolor=#fefefe
| 277311 ||  || — || September 29, 2005 || Mount Lemmon || Mount Lemmon Survey || NYS || align=right data-sort-value="0.79" | 790 m || 
|-id=312 bgcolor=#fefefe
| 277312 ||  || — || September 29, 2005 || Mount Lemmon || Mount Lemmon Survey || — || align=right data-sort-value="0.92" | 920 m || 
|-id=313 bgcolor=#fefefe
| 277313 ||  || — || September 30, 2005 || Anderson Mesa || LONEOS || NYS || align=right data-sort-value="0.78" | 780 m || 
|-id=314 bgcolor=#fefefe
| 277314 ||  || — || September 30, 2005 || Socorro || LINEAR || V || align=right | 1.0 km || 
|-id=315 bgcolor=#fefefe
| 277315 ||  || — || September 30, 2005 || Palomar || NEAT || V || align=right data-sort-value="0.85" | 850 m || 
|-id=316 bgcolor=#fefefe
| 277316 ||  || — || September 30, 2005 || Mount Lemmon || Mount Lemmon Survey || NYS || align=right data-sort-value="0.86" | 860 m || 
|-id=317 bgcolor=#fefefe
| 277317 ||  || — || September 30, 2005 || Mount Lemmon || Mount Lemmon Survey || MAS || align=right | 1.0 km || 
|-id=318 bgcolor=#fefefe
| 277318 ||  || — || September 30, 2005 || Catalina || CSS || FLO || align=right data-sort-value="0.86" | 860 m || 
|-id=319 bgcolor=#fefefe
| 277319 ||  || — || September 30, 2005 || Palomar || NEAT || — || align=right | 1.2 km || 
|-id=320 bgcolor=#fefefe
| 277320 ||  || — || September 30, 2005 || Palomar || NEAT || FLO || align=right | 1.0 km || 
|-id=321 bgcolor=#fefefe
| 277321 ||  || — || September 30, 2005 || Palomar || NEAT || — || align=right | 1.2 km || 
|-id=322 bgcolor=#fefefe
| 277322 ||  || — || September 29, 2005 || Mount Lemmon || Mount Lemmon Survey || NYS || align=right data-sort-value="0.66" | 660 m || 
|-id=323 bgcolor=#fefefe
| 277323 ||  || — || September 30, 2005 || Mount Lemmon || Mount Lemmon Survey || — || align=right data-sort-value="0.85" | 850 m || 
|-id=324 bgcolor=#fefefe
| 277324 ||  || — || September 30, 2005 || Kitt Peak || Spacewatch || — || align=right data-sort-value="0.92" | 920 m || 
|-id=325 bgcolor=#fefefe
| 277325 ||  || — || September 30, 2005 || Palomar || NEAT || V || align=right data-sort-value="0.89" | 890 m || 
|-id=326 bgcolor=#fefefe
| 277326 ||  || — || September 23, 2005 || Anderson Mesa || LONEOS || FLO || align=right data-sort-value="0.91" | 910 m || 
|-id=327 bgcolor=#d6d6d6
| 277327 ||  || — || September 22, 2005 || Palomar || NEAT || 3:2 || align=right | 7.1 km || 
|-id=328 bgcolor=#E9E9E9
| 277328 ||  || — || September 26, 2005 || Kitt Peak || Spacewatch || — || align=right data-sort-value="0.78" | 780 m || 
|-id=329 bgcolor=#fefefe
| 277329 ||  || — || September 30, 2005 || Mount Lemmon || Mount Lemmon Survey || V || align=right data-sort-value="0.92" | 920 m || 
|-id=330 bgcolor=#fefefe
| 277330 ||  || — || September 22, 2005 || Palomar || NEAT || — || align=right | 1.1 km || 
|-id=331 bgcolor=#E9E9E9
| 277331 ||  || — || October 1, 2005 || Kitt Peak || Spacewatch || — || align=right | 1.00 km || 
|-id=332 bgcolor=#fefefe
| 277332 ||  || — || October 1, 2005 || Kitt Peak || Spacewatch || — || align=right | 1.2 km || 
|-id=333 bgcolor=#fefefe
| 277333 ||  || — || October 1, 2005 || Socorro || LINEAR || — || align=right | 1.1 km || 
|-id=334 bgcolor=#E9E9E9
| 277334 ||  || — || October 1, 2005 || Mount Lemmon || Mount Lemmon Survey || — || align=right | 1.2 km || 
|-id=335 bgcolor=#fefefe
| 277335 ||  || — || October 1, 2005 || Catalina || CSS || NYS || align=right data-sort-value="0.87" | 870 m || 
|-id=336 bgcolor=#fefefe
| 277336 ||  || — || October 1, 2005 || Anderson Mesa || LONEOS || V || align=right | 1.0 km || 
|-id=337 bgcolor=#fefefe
| 277337 ||  || — || October 1, 2005 || Kitt Peak || Spacewatch || V || align=right data-sort-value="0.78" | 780 m || 
|-id=338 bgcolor=#fefefe
| 277338 ||  || — || October 3, 2005 || Palomar || NEAT || FLO || align=right | 1.1 km || 
|-id=339 bgcolor=#fefefe
| 277339 ||  || — || October 6, 2005 || Junk Bond || D. Healy || — || align=right data-sort-value="0.93" | 930 m || 
|-id=340 bgcolor=#fefefe
| 277340 ||  || — || October 6, 2005 || Anderson Mesa || LONEOS || — || align=right | 1.0 km || 
|-id=341 bgcolor=#fefefe
| 277341 ||  || — || October 6, 2005 || Mount Lemmon || Mount Lemmon Survey || FLO || align=right data-sort-value="0.66" | 660 m || 
|-id=342 bgcolor=#E9E9E9
| 277342 ||  || — || October 6, 2005 || Catalina || CSS || — || align=right | 1.3 km || 
|-id=343 bgcolor=#fefefe
| 277343 ||  || — || October 7, 2005 || Anderson Mesa || LONEOS || V || align=right data-sort-value="0.83" | 830 m || 
|-id=344 bgcolor=#fefefe
| 277344 ||  || — || October 3, 2005 || Catalina || CSS || V || align=right data-sort-value="0.89" | 890 m || 
|-id=345 bgcolor=#E9E9E9
| 277345 ||  || — || October 7, 2005 || Anderson Mesa || LONEOS || JUN || align=right | 1.5 km || 
|-id=346 bgcolor=#fefefe
| 277346 ||  || — || October 8, 2005 || Anderson Mesa || LONEOS || — || align=right | 1.2 km || 
|-id=347 bgcolor=#fefefe
| 277347 ||  || — || October 3, 2005 || Socorro || LINEAR || V || align=right | 1.0 km || 
|-id=348 bgcolor=#fefefe
| 277348 ||  || — || October 3, 2005 || Socorro || LINEAR || — || align=right | 1.1 km || 
|-id=349 bgcolor=#fefefe
| 277349 ||  || — || October 3, 2005 || Socorro || LINEAR || — || align=right | 1.5 km || 
|-id=350 bgcolor=#fefefe
| 277350 ||  || — || October 7, 2005 || Catalina || CSS || V || align=right data-sort-value="0.96" | 960 m || 
|-id=351 bgcolor=#fefefe
| 277351 ||  || — || October 7, 2005 || Catalina || CSS || V || align=right data-sort-value="0.93" | 930 m || 
|-id=352 bgcolor=#fefefe
| 277352 ||  || — || October 7, 2005 || Mount Lemmon || Mount Lemmon Survey || — || align=right data-sort-value="0.96" | 960 m || 
|-id=353 bgcolor=#FA8072
| 277353 ||  || — || October 8, 2005 || Socorro || LINEAR || — || align=right | 1.2 km || 
|-id=354 bgcolor=#fefefe
| 277354 ||  || — || October 7, 2005 || Kitt Peak || Spacewatch || V || align=right data-sort-value="0.67" | 670 m || 
|-id=355 bgcolor=#fefefe
| 277355 ||  || — || October 7, 2005 || Kitt Peak || Spacewatch || V || align=right | 2.0 km || 
|-id=356 bgcolor=#fefefe
| 277356 ||  || — || October 7, 2005 || Kitt Peak || Spacewatch || — || align=right data-sort-value="0.94" | 940 m || 
|-id=357 bgcolor=#fefefe
| 277357 ||  || — || October 7, 2005 || Catalina || CSS || NYS || align=right data-sort-value="0.66" | 660 m || 
|-id=358 bgcolor=#fefefe
| 277358 ||  || — || October 7, 2005 || Kitt Peak || Spacewatch || NYS || align=right data-sort-value="0.70" | 700 m || 
|-id=359 bgcolor=#fefefe
| 277359 ||  || — || October 8, 2005 || Kitt Peak || Spacewatch || CLA || align=right | 2.0 km || 
|-id=360 bgcolor=#fefefe
| 277360 ||  || — || October 8, 2005 || Kitt Peak || Spacewatch || — || align=right data-sort-value="0.86" | 860 m || 
|-id=361 bgcolor=#E9E9E9
| 277361 ||  || — || October 9, 2005 || Kitt Peak || Spacewatch || — || align=right | 1.5 km || 
|-id=362 bgcolor=#E9E9E9
| 277362 ||  || — || October 9, 2005 || Kitt Peak || Spacewatch || — || align=right | 1.0 km || 
|-id=363 bgcolor=#fefefe
| 277363 ||  || — || October 9, 2005 || Kitt Peak || Spacewatch || MAS || align=right data-sort-value="0.84" | 840 m || 
|-id=364 bgcolor=#d6d6d6
| 277364 ||  || — || October 9, 2005 || Kitt Peak || Spacewatch || — || align=right | 3.0 km || 
|-id=365 bgcolor=#fefefe
| 277365 ||  || — || October 12, 2005 || Kitt Peak || Spacewatch || — || align=right | 1.1 km || 
|-id=366 bgcolor=#fefefe
| 277366 ||  || — || October 3, 2005 || Catalina || CSS || — || align=right data-sort-value="0.94" | 940 m || 
|-id=367 bgcolor=#fefefe
| 277367 ||  || — || October 1, 2005 || Mount Lemmon || Mount Lemmon Survey || V || align=right data-sort-value="0.62" | 620 m || 
|-id=368 bgcolor=#fefefe
| 277368 ||  || — || October 2, 2005 || Anderson Mesa || LONEOS || — || align=right data-sort-value="0.94" | 940 m || 
|-id=369 bgcolor=#d6d6d6
| 277369 ||  || — || October 20, 2005 || Junk Bond || D. Healy || KOR || align=right | 2.0 km || 
|-id=370 bgcolor=#E9E9E9
| 277370 ||  || — || October 22, 2005 || Junk Bond || D. Healy || — || align=right | 1.5 km || 
|-id=371 bgcolor=#FA8072
| 277371 ||  || — || October 21, 2005 || Palomar || NEAT || — || align=right data-sort-value="0.96" | 960 m || 
|-id=372 bgcolor=#fefefe
| 277372 ||  || — || October 22, 2005 || Kitt Peak || Spacewatch || — || align=right | 1.1 km || 
|-id=373 bgcolor=#d6d6d6
| 277373 ||  || — || October 22, 2005 || Kitt Peak || Spacewatch || slow || align=right | 4.2 km || 
|-id=374 bgcolor=#d6d6d6
| 277374 ||  || — || October 23, 2005 || Kitt Peak || Spacewatch || URS || align=right | 4.8 km || 
|-id=375 bgcolor=#E9E9E9
| 277375 ||  || — || October 23, 2005 || Catalina || CSS || — || align=right | 1.4 km || 
|-id=376 bgcolor=#fefefe
| 277376 ||  || — || October 23, 2005 || Catalina || CSS || FLO || align=right data-sort-value="0.99" | 990 m || 
|-id=377 bgcolor=#fefefe
| 277377 ||  || — || October 23, 2005 || Catalina || CSS || — || align=right | 1.3 km || 
|-id=378 bgcolor=#E9E9E9
| 277378 ||  || — || October 24, 2005 || Kitt Peak || Spacewatch || — || align=right | 1.0 km || 
|-id=379 bgcolor=#fefefe
| 277379 ||  || — || October 24, 2005 || Kitt Peak || Spacewatch || NYS || align=right data-sort-value="0.88" | 880 m || 
|-id=380 bgcolor=#d6d6d6
| 277380 ||  || — || October 25, 2005 || Catalina || CSS || VER || align=right | 3.8 km || 
|-id=381 bgcolor=#fefefe
| 277381 ||  || — || October 22, 2005 || Palomar || NEAT || — || align=right | 1.3 km || 
|-id=382 bgcolor=#fefefe
| 277382 ||  || — || October 23, 2005 || Catalina || CSS || — || align=right | 1.2 km || 
|-id=383 bgcolor=#fefefe
| 277383 ||  || — || October 25, 2005 || Kitt Peak || Spacewatch || — || align=right | 1.4 km || 
|-id=384 bgcolor=#E9E9E9
| 277384 ||  || — || October 22, 2005 || Kitt Peak || Spacewatch || — || align=right | 1.3 km || 
|-id=385 bgcolor=#E9E9E9
| 277385 ||  || — || October 22, 2005 || Kitt Peak || Spacewatch || — || align=right | 1.6 km || 
|-id=386 bgcolor=#d6d6d6
| 277386 ||  || — || October 22, 2005 || Kitt Peak || Spacewatch || — || align=right | 2.8 km || 
|-id=387 bgcolor=#fefefe
| 277387 ||  || — || October 24, 2005 || Kitt Peak || Spacewatch || MAS || align=right data-sort-value="0.73" | 730 m || 
|-id=388 bgcolor=#fefefe
| 277388 ||  || — || October 24, 2005 || Kitt Peak || Spacewatch || — || align=right data-sort-value="0.97" | 970 m || 
|-id=389 bgcolor=#E9E9E9
| 277389 ||  || — || October 24, 2005 || Kitt Peak || Spacewatch || — || align=right data-sort-value="0.97" | 970 m || 
|-id=390 bgcolor=#fefefe
| 277390 ||  || — || October 24, 2005 || Kitt Peak || Spacewatch || MAS || align=right data-sort-value="0.91" | 910 m || 
|-id=391 bgcolor=#fefefe
| 277391 ||  || — || October 24, 2005 || Palomar || NEAT || — || align=right | 1.4 km || 
|-id=392 bgcolor=#E9E9E9
| 277392 ||  || — || October 25, 2005 || Catalina || CSS || HNS || align=right | 1.5 km || 
|-id=393 bgcolor=#fefefe
| 277393 ||  || — || October 26, 2005 || Kitt Peak || Spacewatch || — || align=right | 1.00 km || 
|-id=394 bgcolor=#d6d6d6
| 277394 ||  || — || October 26, 2005 || Kitt Peak || Spacewatch || HYG || align=right | 4.0 km || 
|-id=395 bgcolor=#fefefe
| 277395 ||  || — || October 26, 2005 || Kitt Peak || Spacewatch || — || align=right data-sort-value="0.98" | 980 m || 
|-id=396 bgcolor=#fefefe
| 277396 ||  || — || October 26, 2005 || Kitt Peak || Spacewatch || — || align=right | 1.2 km || 
|-id=397 bgcolor=#E9E9E9
| 277397 ||  || — || October 28, 2005 || Junk Bond || D. Healy || — || align=right | 1.1 km || 
|-id=398 bgcolor=#fefefe
| 277398 ||  || — || October 27, 2005 || Anderson Mesa || LONEOS || — || align=right | 1.3 km || 
|-id=399 bgcolor=#E9E9E9
| 277399 ||  || — || October 24, 2005 || Kitt Peak || Spacewatch || — || align=right | 1.7 km || 
|-id=400 bgcolor=#fefefe
| 277400 ||  || — || October 24, 2005 || Kitt Peak || Spacewatch || — || align=right data-sort-value="0.91" | 910 m || 
|}

277401–277500 

|-bgcolor=#E9E9E9
| 277401 ||  || — || October 24, 2005 || Kitt Peak || Spacewatch || — || align=right | 1.5 km || 
|-id=402 bgcolor=#E9E9E9
| 277402 ||  || — || October 24, 2005 || Kitt Peak || Spacewatch || — || align=right | 1.7 km || 
|-id=403 bgcolor=#fefefe
| 277403 ||  || — || October 24, 2005 || Kitt Peak || Spacewatch || — || align=right data-sort-value="0.93" | 930 m || 
|-id=404 bgcolor=#fefefe
| 277404 ||  || — || October 25, 2005 || Mount Lemmon || Mount Lemmon Survey || — || align=right data-sort-value="0.87" | 870 m || 
|-id=405 bgcolor=#d6d6d6
| 277405 ||  || — || October 22, 2005 || Catalina || CSS || — || align=right | 3.2 km || 
|-id=406 bgcolor=#E9E9E9
| 277406 ||  || — || October 25, 2005 || Mount Lemmon || Mount Lemmon Survey || — || align=right | 2.1 km || 
|-id=407 bgcolor=#fefefe
| 277407 ||  || — || October 26, 2005 || Kitt Peak || Spacewatch || — || align=right | 1.00 km || 
|-id=408 bgcolor=#E9E9E9
| 277408 ||  || — || October 27, 2005 || Kitt Peak || Spacewatch || — || align=right | 1.2 km || 
|-id=409 bgcolor=#E9E9E9
| 277409 ||  || — || October 22, 2005 || Kitt Peak || Spacewatch || — || align=right data-sort-value="0.90" | 900 m || 
|-id=410 bgcolor=#fefefe
| 277410 ||  || — || October 25, 2005 || Kitt Peak || Spacewatch || — || align=right data-sort-value="0.76" | 760 m || 
|-id=411 bgcolor=#fefefe
| 277411 ||  || — || October 25, 2005 || Kitt Peak || Spacewatch || — || align=right data-sort-value="0.93" | 930 m || 
|-id=412 bgcolor=#d6d6d6
| 277412 ||  || — || October 25, 2005 || Kitt Peak || Spacewatch || — || align=right | 3.3 km || 
|-id=413 bgcolor=#fefefe
| 277413 ||  || — || October 25, 2005 || Catalina || CSS || — || align=right | 1.1 km || 
|-id=414 bgcolor=#E9E9E9
| 277414 ||  || — || October 25, 2005 || Mount Lemmon || Mount Lemmon Survey || — || align=right data-sort-value="0.81" | 810 m || 
|-id=415 bgcolor=#fefefe
| 277415 ||  || — || October 25, 2005 || Mount Lemmon || Mount Lemmon Survey || V || align=right data-sort-value="0.86" | 860 m || 
|-id=416 bgcolor=#fefefe
| 277416 ||  || — || October 25, 2005 || Kitt Peak || Spacewatch || — || align=right data-sort-value="0.82" | 820 m || 
|-id=417 bgcolor=#fefefe
| 277417 ||  || — || October 27, 2005 || Mount Lemmon || Mount Lemmon Survey || — || align=right | 1.0 km || 
|-id=418 bgcolor=#fefefe
| 277418 ||  || — || October 25, 2005 || Mount Lemmon || Mount Lemmon Survey || MAS || align=right data-sort-value="0.77" | 770 m || 
|-id=419 bgcolor=#fefefe
| 277419 ||  || — || October 25, 2005 || Kitt Peak || Spacewatch || — || align=right data-sort-value="0.78" | 780 m || 
|-id=420 bgcolor=#fefefe
| 277420 ||  || — || October 28, 2005 || Socorro || LINEAR || NYS || align=right data-sort-value="0.95" | 950 m || 
|-id=421 bgcolor=#fefefe
| 277421 ||  || — || October 26, 2005 || Kitt Peak || Spacewatch || — || align=right | 1.2 km || 
|-id=422 bgcolor=#fefefe
| 277422 ||  || — || October 27, 2005 || Socorro || LINEAR || V || align=right data-sort-value="0.82" | 820 m || 
|-id=423 bgcolor=#FA8072
| 277423 ||  || — || October 27, 2005 || Catalina || CSS || — || align=right | 1.0 km || 
|-id=424 bgcolor=#fefefe
| 277424 ||  || — || October 30, 2005 || Palomar || NEAT || V || align=right data-sort-value="0.98" | 980 m || 
|-id=425 bgcolor=#fefefe
| 277425 ||  || — || October 29, 2005 || Kitt Peak || Spacewatch || LCI || align=right | 1.5 km || 
|-id=426 bgcolor=#fefefe
| 277426 ||  || — || October 27, 2005 || Kitt Peak || Spacewatch || — || align=right data-sort-value="0.85" | 850 m || 
|-id=427 bgcolor=#fefefe
| 277427 ||  || — || October 27, 2005 || Kitt Peak || Spacewatch || NYS || align=right data-sort-value="0.63" | 630 m || 
|-id=428 bgcolor=#fefefe
| 277428 ||  || — || October 27, 2005 || Kitt Peak || Spacewatch || — || align=right data-sort-value="0.81" | 810 m || 
|-id=429 bgcolor=#fefefe
| 277429 ||  || — || October 27, 2005 || Kitt Peak || Spacewatch || — || align=right data-sort-value="0.98" | 980 m || 
|-id=430 bgcolor=#d6d6d6
| 277430 ||  || — || October 27, 2005 || Kitt Peak || Spacewatch || — || align=right | 3.2 km || 
|-id=431 bgcolor=#E9E9E9
| 277431 ||  || — || October 29, 2005 || Mount Lemmon || Mount Lemmon Survey || — || align=right | 1.1 km || 
|-id=432 bgcolor=#fefefe
| 277432 ||  || — || October 30, 2005 || Mount Lemmon || Mount Lemmon Survey || — || align=right data-sort-value="0.86" | 860 m || 
|-id=433 bgcolor=#fefefe
| 277433 ||  || — || October 27, 2005 || Socorro || LINEAR || — || align=right data-sort-value="0.98" | 980 m || 
|-id=434 bgcolor=#fefefe
| 277434 ||  || — || October 30, 2005 || Mount Lemmon || Mount Lemmon Survey || CLA || align=right | 2.1 km || 
|-id=435 bgcolor=#fefefe
| 277435 ||  || — || October 26, 2005 || Kitt Peak || Spacewatch || NYS || align=right data-sort-value="0.89" | 890 m || 
|-id=436 bgcolor=#fefefe
| 277436 ||  || — || October 28, 2005 || Mount Lemmon || Mount Lemmon Survey || MAS || align=right data-sort-value="0.96" | 960 m || 
|-id=437 bgcolor=#d6d6d6
| 277437 ||  || — || October 28, 2005 || Kitt Peak || Spacewatch || — || align=right | 3.6 km || 
|-id=438 bgcolor=#fefefe
| 277438 ||  || — || October 28, 2005 || Kitt Peak || Spacewatch || NYS || align=right data-sort-value="0.77" | 770 m || 
|-id=439 bgcolor=#E9E9E9
| 277439 ||  || — || October 29, 2005 || Catalina || CSS || RAF || align=right data-sort-value="0.95" | 950 m || 
|-id=440 bgcolor=#fefefe
| 277440 ||  || — || October 29, 2005 || Mount Lemmon || Mount Lemmon Survey || V || align=right data-sort-value="0.82" | 820 m || 
|-id=441 bgcolor=#d6d6d6
| 277441 ||  || — || October 30, 2005 || Socorro || LINEAR || — || align=right | 3.0 km || 
|-id=442 bgcolor=#fefefe
| 277442 ||  || — || October 28, 2005 || Catalina || CSS || V || align=right data-sort-value="0.82" | 820 m || 
|-id=443 bgcolor=#E9E9E9
| 277443 ||  || — || October 29, 2005 || Catalina || CSS || BRG || align=right | 1.9 km || 
|-id=444 bgcolor=#E9E9E9
| 277444 ||  || — || October 28, 2005 || Mount Lemmon || Mount Lemmon Survey || — || align=right | 1.4 km || 
|-id=445 bgcolor=#fefefe
| 277445 ||  || — || October 30, 2005 || Kitt Peak || Spacewatch || V || align=right data-sort-value="0.79" | 790 m || 
|-id=446 bgcolor=#E9E9E9
| 277446 ||  || — || October 25, 2005 || Kitt Peak || Spacewatch || — || align=right | 1.4 km || 
|-id=447 bgcolor=#fefefe
| 277447 ||  || — || October 25, 2005 || Socorro || LINEAR || PHO || align=right | 1.1 km || 
|-id=448 bgcolor=#E9E9E9
| 277448 ||  || — || October 23, 2005 || Catalina || CSS || INO || align=right | 1.4 km || 
|-id=449 bgcolor=#E9E9E9
| 277449 ||  || — || October 25, 2005 || Anderson Mesa || LONEOS || — || align=right | 1.3 km || 
|-id=450 bgcolor=#fefefe
| 277450 ||  || — || October 27, 2005 || Socorro || LINEAR || — || align=right data-sort-value="0.90" | 900 m || 
|-id=451 bgcolor=#E9E9E9
| 277451 ||  || — || October 24, 2005 || Mauna Kea || D. J. Tholen || HOF || align=right | 3.0 km || 
|-id=452 bgcolor=#d6d6d6
| 277452 ||  || — || October 25, 2005 || Catalina || CSS || — || align=right | 4.8 km || 
|-id=453 bgcolor=#E9E9E9
| 277453 ||  || — || October 25, 2005 || Mount Lemmon || Mount Lemmon Survey || — || align=right | 1.6 km || 
|-id=454 bgcolor=#E9E9E9
| 277454 ||  || — || October 22, 2005 || Kitt Peak || Spacewatch || — || align=right | 1.3 km || 
|-id=455 bgcolor=#E9E9E9
| 277455 ||  || — || October 30, 2005 || Kitt Peak || Spacewatch || — || align=right data-sort-value="0.94" | 940 m || 
|-id=456 bgcolor=#E9E9E9
| 277456 ||  || — || October 30, 2005 || Mount Lemmon || Mount Lemmon Survey || — || align=right | 1.9 km || 
|-id=457 bgcolor=#d6d6d6
| 277457 ||  || — || October 22, 2005 || Apache Point || A. C. Becker || — || align=right | 3.4 km || 
|-id=458 bgcolor=#d6d6d6
| 277458 ||  || — || October 25, 2005 || Apache Point || A. C. Becker || — || align=right | 3.2 km || 
|-id=459 bgcolor=#E9E9E9
| 277459 ||  || — || October 30, 2005 || Kitt Peak || Spacewatch || — || align=right | 1.3 km || 
|-id=460 bgcolor=#E9E9E9
| 277460 ||  || — || October 25, 2005 || Mount Lemmon || Mount Lemmon Survey || — || align=right | 1.6 km || 
|-id=461 bgcolor=#E9E9E9
| 277461 ||  || — || November 6, 2005 || Kitt Peak || Spacewatch || — || align=right | 1.3 km || 
|-id=462 bgcolor=#fefefe
| 277462 ||  || — || November 3, 2005 || Catalina || CSS || — || align=right | 1.1 km || 
|-id=463 bgcolor=#E9E9E9
| 277463 ||  || — || November 4, 2005 || Mount Lemmon || Mount Lemmon Survey || — || align=right | 1.1 km || 
|-id=464 bgcolor=#d6d6d6
| 277464 ||  || — || November 2, 2005 || Mount Lemmon || Mount Lemmon Survey || — || align=right | 3.9 km || 
|-id=465 bgcolor=#fefefe
| 277465 ||  || — || November 3, 2005 || Mount Lemmon || Mount Lemmon Survey || — || align=right | 1.1 km || 
|-id=466 bgcolor=#fefefe
| 277466 ||  || — || November 3, 2005 || Catalina || CSS || — || align=right | 1.1 km || 
|-id=467 bgcolor=#E9E9E9
| 277467 ||  || — || November 4, 2005 || Mount Lemmon || Mount Lemmon Survey || — || align=right data-sort-value="0.86" | 860 m || 
|-id=468 bgcolor=#d6d6d6
| 277468 ||  || — || November 5, 2005 || Kitt Peak || Spacewatch || — || align=right | 3.2 km || 
|-id=469 bgcolor=#d6d6d6
| 277469 ||  || — || November 6, 2005 || Kitt Peak || Spacewatch || — || align=right | 4.9 km || 
|-id=470 bgcolor=#fefefe
| 277470 ||  || — || November 6, 2005 || Kitt Peak || Spacewatch || — || align=right data-sort-value="0.86" | 860 m || 
|-id=471 bgcolor=#d6d6d6
| 277471 ||  || — || November 1, 2005 || Kitt Peak || Spacewatch || — || align=right | 3.2 km || 
|-id=472 bgcolor=#fefefe
| 277472 ||  || — || November 12, 2005 || Kitt Peak || Spacewatch || V || align=right data-sort-value="0.75" | 750 m || 
|-id=473 bgcolor=#FFC2E0
| 277473 ||  || — || November 21, 2005 || Socorro || LINEAR || AMO +1km || align=right | 1.5 km || 
|-id=474 bgcolor=#E9E9E9
| 277474 ||  || — || November 20, 2005 || Anderson Mesa || LONEOS || — || align=right | 1.8 km || 
|-id=475 bgcolor=#FFC2E0
| 277475 ||  || — || November 27, 2005 || Siding Spring || SSS || APOPHAcritical || align=right data-sort-value="0.36" | 360 m || 
|-id=476 bgcolor=#d6d6d6
| 277476 ||  || — || November 21, 2005 || Catalina || CSS || — || align=right | 2.8 km || 
|-id=477 bgcolor=#fefefe
| 277477 ||  || — || November 22, 2005 || Kitt Peak || Spacewatch || V || align=right data-sort-value="0.85" | 850 m || 
|-id=478 bgcolor=#fefefe
| 277478 ||  || — || November 22, 2005 || Kitt Peak || Spacewatch || — || align=right data-sort-value="0.95" | 950 m || 
|-id=479 bgcolor=#fefefe
| 277479 ||  || — || November 21, 2005 || Kitt Peak || Spacewatch || MAS || align=right data-sort-value="0.78" | 780 m || 
|-id=480 bgcolor=#d6d6d6
| 277480 ||  || — || November 21, 2005 || Catalina || CSS || CRO || align=right | 3.5 km || 
|-id=481 bgcolor=#E9E9E9
| 277481 ||  || — || November 22, 2005 || Kitt Peak || Spacewatch || — || align=right | 1.5 km || 
|-id=482 bgcolor=#E9E9E9
| 277482 ||  || — || November 22, 2005 || Kitt Peak || Spacewatch || — || align=right | 1.1 km || 
|-id=483 bgcolor=#E9E9E9
| 277483 ||  || — || November 25, 2005 || Kitt Peak || Spacewatch || — || align=right | 1.4 km || 
|-id=484 bgcolor=#E9E9E9
| 277484 ||  || — || November 25, 2005 || Kitt Peak || Spacewatch || — || align=right data-sort-value="0.94" | 940 m || 
|-id=485 bgcolor=#E9E9E9
| 277485 ||  || — || November 20, 2005 || Anderson Mesa || LONEOS || — || align=right | 1.8 km || 
|-id=486 bgcolor=#E9E9E9
| 277486 ||  || — || November 25, 2005 || Kitt Peak || Spacewatch || — || align=right | 1.2 km || 
|-id=487 bgcolor=#d6d6d6
| 277487 ||  || — || November 25, 2005 || Kitt Peak || Spacewatch || TIR || align=right | 4.2 km || 
|-id=488 bgcolor=#E9E9E9
| 277488 ||  || — || November 27, 2005 || Anderson Mesa || LONEOS || INO || align=right | 1.2 km || 
|-id=489 bgcolor=#fefefe
| 277489 ||  || — || November 25, 2005 || Kitt Peak || Spacewatch || NYS || align=right data-sort-value="0.86" | 860 m || 
|-id=490 bgcolor=#fefefe
| 277490 ||  || — || November 28, 2005 || Socorro || LINEAR || — || align=right | 1.3 km || 
|-id=491 bgcolor=#E9E9E9
| 277491 ||  || — || November 26, 2005 || Mount Lemmon || Mount Lemmon Survey || — || align=right | 2.4 km || 
|-id=492 bgcolor=#E9E9E9
| 277492 ||  || — || November 28, 2005 || Mount Lemmon || Mount Lemmon Survey || AER || align=right | 2.9 km || 
|-id=493 bgcolor=#fefefe
| 277493 ||  || — || November 26, 2005 || Kitt Peak || Spacewatch || — || align=right data-sort-value="0.82" | 820 m || 
|-id=494 bgcolor=#E9E9E9
| 277494 ||  || — || November 29, 2005 || Catalina || CSS || — || align=right | 1.6 km || 
|-id=495 bgcolor=#E9E9E9
| 277495 ||  || — || November 30, 2005 || Kitt Peak || Spacewatch || — || align=right | 1.4 km || 
|-id=496 bgcolor=#E9E9E9
| 277496 ||  || — || November 28, 2005 || Catalina || CSS || — || align=right data-sort-value="0.97" | 970 m || 
|-id=497 bgcolor=#E9E9E9
| 277497 ||  || — || November 28, 2005 || Catalina || CSS || — || align=right | 1.7 km || 
|-id=498 bgcolor=#E9E9E9
| 277498 ||  || — || November 29, 2005 || Kitt Peak || Spacewatch || — || align=right | 1.0 km || 
|-id=499 bgcolor=#E9E9E9
| 277499 ||  || — || November 30, 2005 || Mount Lemmon || Mount Lemmon Survey || — || align=right | 1.1 km || 
|-id=500 bgcolor=#E9E9E9
| 277500 ||  || — || November 25, 2005 || Mount Lemmon || Mount Lemmon Survey || — || align=right | 1.6 km || 
|}

277501–277600 

|-bgcolor=#fefefe
| 277501 ||  || — || November 25, 2005 || Mount Lemmon || Mount Lemmon Survey || — || align=right | 1.0 km || 
|-id=502 bgcolor=#E9E9E9
| 277502 ||  || — || November 25, 2005 || Mount Lemmon || Mount Lemmon Survey || PAD || align=right | 3.2 km || 
|-id=503 bgcolor=#E9E9E9
| 277503 ||  || — || April 25, 2003 || Kitt Peak || Spacewatch || EUN || align=right | 1.4 km || 
|-id=504 bgcolor=#fefefe
| 277504 ||  || — || November 28, 2005 || Kitt Peak || Spacewatch || — || align=right | 1.2 km || 
|-id=505 bgcolor=#fefefe
| 277505 ||  || — || November 26, 2005 || Mount Lemmon || Mount Lemmon Survey || — || align=right | 1.8 km || 
|-id=506 bgcolor=#d6d6d6
| 277506 ||  || — || November 29, 2005 || Kitt Peak || Spacewatch || — || align=right | 4.5 km || 
|-id=507 bgcolor=#E9E9E9
| 277507 ||  || — || November 29, 2005 || Mount Lemmon || Mount Lemmon Survey || — || align=right data-sort-value="0.89" | 890 m || 
|-id=508 bgcolor=#fefefe
| 277508 ||  || — || November 30, 2005 || Mount Lemmon || Mount Lemmon Survey || NYS || align=right data-sort-value="0.76" | 760 m || 
|-id=509 bgcolor=#E9E9E9
| 277509 ||  || — || November 30, 2005 || Kitt Peak || Spacewatch || — || align=right data-sort-value="0.92" | 920 m || 
|-id=510 bgcolor=#E9E9E9
| 277510 ||  || — || November 30, 2005 || Kitt Peak || Spacewatch || WIT || align=right | 1.5 km || 
|-id=511 bgcolor=#E9E9E9
| 277511 ||  || — || November 25, 2005 || Catalina || CSS || GEF || align=right | 1.9 km || 
|-id=512 bgcolor=#E9E9E9
| 277512 ||  || — || November 21, 2005 || Catalina || CSS || — || align=right | 2.1 km || 
|-id=513 bgcolor=#E9E9E9
| 277513 ||  || — || November 29, 2005 || Palomar || NEAT || — || align=right | 1.3 km || 
|-id=514 bgcolor=#d6d6d6
| 277514 ||  || — || November 30, 2005 || Socorro || LINEAR || — || align=right | 3.9 km || 
|-id=515 bgcolor=#E9E9E9
| 277515 ||  || — || November 30, 2005 || Socorro || LINEAR || HNS || align=right | 2.2 km || 
|-id=516 bgcolor=#E9E9E9
| 277516 ||  || — || November 28, 2005 || Socorro || LINEAR || — || align=right | 2.5 km || 
|-id=517 bgcolor=#fefefe
| 277517 ||  || — || November 30, 2005 || Kitt Peak || Spacewatch || LCI || align=right | 1.4 km || 
|-id=518 bgcolor=#E9E9E9
| 277518 ||  || — || November 25, 2005 || Kitt Peak || Spacewatch || — || align=right data-sort-value="0.88" | 880 m || 
|-id=519 bgcolor=#E9E9E9
| 277519 ||  || — || November 25, 2005 || Kitt Peak || Spacewatch || — || align=right | 1.2 km || 
|-id=520 bgcolor=#fefefe
| 277520 ||  || — || November 29, 2005 || Kitt Peak || Spacewatch || NYS || align=right data-sort-value="0.84" | 840 m || 
|-id=521 bgcolor=#E9E9E9
| 277521 ||  || — || December 1, 2005 || Kitt Peak || Spacewatch || AGN || align=right | 1.8 km || 
|-id=522 bgcolor=#fefefe
| 277522 ||  || — || December 1, 2005 || Kitt Peak || Spacewatch || NYS || align=right data-sort-value="0.92" | 920 m || 
|-id=523 bgcolor=#E9E9E9
| 277523 ||  || — || December 2, 2005 || Kitt Peak || Spacewatch || — || align=right data-sort-value="0.94" | 940 m || 
|-id=524 bgcolor=#d6d6d6
| 277524 ||  || — || December 2, 2005 || Socorro || LINEAR || HYG || align=right | 3.8 km || 
|-id=525 bgcolor=#fefefe
| 277525 ||  || — || December 4, 2005 || Kitt Peak || Spacewatch || MAS || align=right data-sort-value="0.88" | 880 m || 
|-id=526 bgcolor=#E9E9E9
| 277526 ||  || — || December 2, 2005 || Kitt Peak || Spacewatch || — || align=right | 2.2 km || 
|-id=527 bgcolor=#E9E9E9
| 277527 ||  || — || December 2, 2005 || Kitt Peak || Spacewatch || JUN || align=right | 1.1 km || 
|-id=528 bgcolor=#fefefe
| 277528 ||  || — || December 2, 2005 || Mount Lemmon || Mount Lemmon Survey || — || align=right | 1.2 km || 
|-id=529 bgcolor=#FA8072
| 277529 ||  || — || December 8, 2005 || Socorro || LINEAR || — || align=right | 1.3 km || 
|-id=530 bgcolor=#FA8072
| 277530 ||  || — || December 8, 2005 || Socorro || LINEAR || — || align=right | 1.5 km || 
|-id=531 bgcolor=#E9E9E9
| 277531 ||  || — || December 6, 2005 || Kitt Peak || Spacewatch || — || align=right | 1.4 km || 
|-id=532 bgcolor=#E9E9E9
| 277532 ||  || — || December 6, 2005 || Kitt Peak || Spacewatch || HOF || align=right | 2.7 km || 
|-id=533 bgcolor=#E9E9E9
| 277533 ||  || — || December 22, 2005 || Pla D'Arguines || R. Ferrando || — || align=right | 1.4 km || 
|-id=534 bgcolor=#E9E9E9
| 277534 ||  || — || December 21, 2005 || Kitt Peak || Spacewatch || — || align=right data-sort-value="0.90" | 900 m || 
|-id=535 bgcolor=#E9E9E9
| 277535 ||  || — || December 22, 2005 || Kitt Peak || Spacewatch || HEN || align=right | 1.0 km || 
|-id=536 bgcolor=#E9E9E9
| 277536 ||  || — || December 24, 2005 || Kitt Peak || Spacewatch || AST || align=right | 2.9 km || 
|-id=537 bgcolor=#E9E9E9
| 277537 ||  || — || December 22, 2005 || Catalina || CSS || — || align=right | 2.8 km || 
|-id=538 bgcolor=#E9E9E9
| 277538 ||  || — || December 22, 2005 || Kitt Peak || Spacewatch || — || align=right | 2.4 km || 
|-id=539 bgcolor=#d6d6d6
| 277539 ||  || — || December 24, 2005 || Kitt Peak || Spacewatch || — || align=right | 3.3 km || 
|-id=540 bgcolor=#E9E9E9
| 277540 ||  || — || December 25, 2005 || Kitt Peak || Spacewatch || — || align=right | 2.9 km || 
|-id=541 bgcolor=#E9E9E9
| 277541 ||  || — || December 22, 2005 || Catalina || CSS || — || align=right | 1.4 km || 
|-id=542 bgcolor=#E9E9E9
| 277542 ||  || — || December 24, 2005 || Kitt Peak || Spacewatch || — || align=right | 1.5 km || 
|-id=543 bgcolor=#E9E9E9
| 277543 ||  || — || December 24, 2005 || Kitt Peak || Spacewatch || — || align=right | 1.8 km || 
|-id=544 bgcolor=#E9E9E9
| 277544 ||  || — || December 24, 2005 || Kitt Peak || Spacewatch || — || align=right | 1.2 km || 
|-id=545 bgcolor=#E9E9E9
| 277545 ||  || — || December 24, 2005 || Kitt Peak || Spacewatch || — || align=right | 1.6 km || 
|-id=546 bgcolor=#fefefe
| 277546 ||  || — || December 25, 2005 || Mount Lemmon || Mount Lemmon Survey || — || align=right data-sort-value="0.94" | 940 m || 
|-id=547 bgcolor=#E9E9E9
| 277547 ||  || — || December 25, 2005 || Mount Lemmon || Mount Lemmon Survey || — || align=right | 1.9 km || 
|-id=548 bgcolor=#E9E9E9
| 277548 ||  || — || December 27, 2005 || Mount Lemmon || Mount Lemmon Survey || — || align=right | 1.4 km || 
|-id=549 bgcolor=#E9E9E9
| 277549 ||  || — || December 25, 2005 || Kitt Peak || Spacewatch || AST || align=right | 1.8 km || 
|-id=550 bgcolor=#E9E9E9
| 277550 ||  || — || December 25, 2005 || Kitt Peak || Spacewatch || — || align=right | 2.2 km || 
|-id=551 bgcolor=#E9E9E9
| 277551 ||  || — || December 25, 2005 || Mount Lemmon || Mount Lemmon Survey || MIS || align=right | 2.8 km || 
|-id=552 bgcolor=#E9E9E9
| 277552 ||  || — || December 25, 2005 || Mount Lemmon || Mount Lemmon Survey || AST || align=right | 1.9 km || 
|-id=553 bgcolor=#E9E9E9
| 277553 ||  || — || December 25, 2005 || Kitt Peak || Spacewatch || — || align=right | 1.1 km || 
|-id=554 bgcolor=#E9E9E9
| 277554 ||  || — || December 25, 2005 || Kitt Peak || Spacewatch || NEM || align=right | 2.3 km || 
|-id=555 bgcolor=#E9E9E9
| 277555 ||  || — || December 25, 2005 || Kitt Peak || Spacewatch || — || align=right | 1.6 km || 
|-id=556 bgcolor=#E9E9E9
| 277556 ||  || — || December 25, 2005 || Kitt Peak || Spacewatch || — || align=right | 1.6 km || 
|-id=557 bgcolor=#E9E9E9
| 277557 ||  || — || December 26, 2005 || Kitt Peak || Spacewatch || — || align=right | 3.5 km || 
|-id=558 bgcolor=#E9E9E9
| 277558 ||  || — || December 26, 2005 || Kitt Peak || Spacewatch || — || align=right | 2.5 km || 
|-id=559 bgcolor=#E9E9E9
| 277559 ||  || — || December 26, 2005 || Kitt Peak || Spacewatch || — || align=right | 1.3 km || 
|-id=560 bgcolor=#E9E9E9
| 277560 ||  || — || December 26, 2005 || Kitt Peak || Spacewatch || — || align=right | 2.0 km || 
|-id=561 bgcolor=#E9E9E9
| 277561 ||  || — || December 28, 2005 || Kitt Peak || Spacewatch || — || align=right | 1.1 km || 
|-id=562 bgcolor=#E9E9E9
| 277562 ||  || — || December 26, 2005 || Kitt Peak || Spacewatch || — || align=right | 1.3 km || 
|-id=563 bgcolor=#E9E9E9
| 277563 ||  || — || December 26, 2005 || Kitt Peak || Spacewatch || — || align=right | 1.3 km || 
|-id=564 bgcolor=#E9E9E9
| 277564 ||  || — || December 28, 2005 || Mount Lemmon || Mount Lemmon Survey || AGN || align=right | 1.5 km || 
|-id=565 bgcolor=#E9E9E9
| 277565 ||  || — || December 29, 2005 || Mount Lemmon || Mount Lemmon Survey || MRX || align=right | 1.1 km || 
|-id=566 bgcolor=#E9E9E9
| 277566 ||  || — || December 29, 2005 || Mount Lemmon || Mount Lemmon Survey || — || align=right | 1.2 km || 
|-id=567 bgcolor=#E9E9E9
| 277567 ||  || — || December 22, 2005 || Catalina || CSS || — || align=right | 1.7 km || 
|-id=568 bgcolor=#E9E9E9
| 277568 ||  || — || December 23, 2005 || Socorro || LINEAR || — || align=right | 1.7 km || 
|-id=569 bgcolor=#E9E9E9
| 277569 ||  || — || December 22, 2005 || Kitt Peak || Spacewatch || WIT || align=right | 1.2 km || 
|-id=570 bgcolor=#FFC2E0
| 277570 ||  || — || December 30, 2005 || Catalina || CSS || APOPHA || align=right data-sort-value="0.44" | 440 m || 
|-id=571 bgcolor=#E9E9E9
| 277571 ||  || — || December 27, 2005 || Mount Lemmon || Mount Lemmon Survey || HEN || align=right | 1.1 km || 
|-id=572 bgcolor=#FA8072
| 277572 ||  || — || December 28, 2005 || Catalina || CSS || — || align=right data-sort-value="0.77" | 770 m || 
|-id=573 bgcolor=#E9E9E9
| 277573 ||  || — || December 30, 2005 || Kitt Peak || Spacewatch || — || align=right | 2.1 km || 
|-id=574 bgcolor=#E9E9E9
| 277574 ||  || — || December 30, 2005 || Kitt Peak || Spacewatch || — || align=right | 1.2 km || 
|-id=575 bgcolor=#E9E9E9
| 277575 ||  || — || December 26, 2005 || Kitt Peak || Spacewatch || — || align=right | 2.2 km || 
|-id=576 bgcolor=#E9E9E9
| 277576 ||  || — || December 24, 2005 || Kitt Peak || Spacewatch || — || align=right | 2.1 km || 
|-id=577 bgcolor=#E9E9E9
| 277577 ||  || — || December 25, 2005 || Mount Lemmon || Mount Lemmon Survey || AGN || align=right | 1.2 km || 
|-id=578 bgcolor=#E9E9E9
| 277578 ||  || — || December 28, 2005 || Catalina || CSS || — || align=right | 2.6 km || 
|-id=579 bgcolor=#E9E9E9
| 277579 ||  || — || December 30, 2005 || Catalina || CSS || EUN || align=right | 3.4 km || 
|-id=580 bgcolor=#E9E9E9
| 277580 ||  || — || December 29, 2005 || Mount Lemmon || Mount Lemmon Survey || — || align=right | 2.1 km || 
|-id=581 bgcolor=#E9E9E9
| 277581 ||  || — || December 28, 2005 || Mount Lemmon || Mount Lemmon Survey || MRX || align=right | 1.2 km || 
|-id=582 bgcolor=#E9E9E9
| 277582 ||  || — || December 28, 2005 || Kitt Peak || Spacewatch || VIB || align=right | 1.9 km || 
|-id=583 bgcolor=#d6d6d6
| 277583 ||  || — || December 25, 2005 || Mount Lemmon || Mount Lemmon Survey || — || align=right | 4.1 km || 
|-id=584 bgcolor=#E9E9E9
| 277584 ||  || — || December 25, 2005 || Mount Lemmon || Mount Lemmon Survey || — || align=right | 3.3 km || 
|-id=585 bgcolor=#fefefe
| 277585 ||  || — || December 25, 2005 || Kitt Peak || Spacewatch || NYS || align=right data-sort-value="0.87" | 870 m || 
|-id=586 bgcolor=#E9E9E9
| 277586 ||  || — || January 5, 2006 || Catalina || CSS || — || align=right | 2.2 km || 
|-id=587 bgcolor=#E9E9E9
| 277587 ||  || — || January 6, 2006 || Socorro || LINEAR || — || align=right | 1.8 km || 
|-id=588 bgcolor=#E9E9E9
| 277588 ||  || — || January 2, 2006 || Mount Lemmon || Mount Lemmon Survey || — || align=right | 1.9 km || 
|-id=589 bgcolor=#E9E9E9
| 277589 ||  || — || January 4, 2006 || Mount Lemmon || Mount Lemmon Survey || — || align=right | 1.7 km || 
|-id=590 bgcolor=#E9E9E9
| 277590 ||  || — || January 4, 2006 || Catalina || CSS || — || align=right | 2.3 km || 
|-id=591 bgcolor=#E9E9E9
| 277591 ||  || — || November 30, 2005 || Mount Lemmon || Mount Lemmon Survey || — || align=right | 2.2 km || 
|-id=592 bgcolor=#d6d6d6
| 277592 ||  || — || January 5, 2006 || Socorro || LINEAR || — || align=right | 3.1 km || 
|-id=593 bgcolor=#E9E9E9
| 277593 ||  || — || January 5, 2006 || Kitt Peak || Spacewatch || — || align=right | 1.5 km || 
|-id=594 bgcolor=#E9E9E9
| 277594 ||  || — || January 5, 2006 || Catalina || CSS || — || align=right | 1.8 km || 
|-id=595 bgcolor=#E9E9E9
| 277595 ||  || — || January 5, 2006 || Catalina || CSS || MAR || align=right | 1.4 km || 
|-id=596 bgcolor=#E9E9E9
| 277596 ||  || — || January 5, 2006 || Mount Lemmon || Mount Lemmon Survey || — || align=right | 1.6 km || 
|-id=597 bgcolor=#E9E9E9
| 277597 ||  || — || January 6, 2006 || Catalina || CSS || — || align=right | 2.2 km || 
|-id=598 bgcolor=#E9E9E9
| 277598 ||  || — || January 4, 2006 || Kitt Peak || Spacewatch || — || align=right | 1.7 km || 
|-id=599 bgcolor=#E9E9E9
| 277599 ||  || — || January 4, 2006 || Kitt Peak || Spacewatch || — || align=right | 1.7 km || 
|-id=600 bgcolor=#E9E9E9
| 277600 ||  || — || January 7, 2006 || Mount Lemmon || Mount Lemmon Survey || — || align=right | 2.7 km || 
|}

277601–277700 

|-bgcolor=#E9E9E9
| 277601 ||  || — || January 5, 2006 || Kitt Peak || Spacewatch || — || align=right | 2.4 km || 
|-id=602 bgcolor=#E9E9E9
| 277602 ||  || — || January 8, 2006 || Mount Lemmon || Mount Lemmon Survey || — || align=right | 2.0 km || 
|-id=603 bgcolor=#E9E9E9
| 277603 ||  || — || January 6, 2006 || Kitt Peak || Spacewatch || PAD || align=right | 1.7 km || 
|-id=604 bgcolor=#E9E9E9
| 277604 ||  || — || January 8, 2006 || Mount Lemmon || Mount Lemmon Survey || — || align=right | 2.5 km || 
|-id=605 bgcolor=#E9E9E9
| 277605 ||  || — || January 9, 2006 || Kitt Peak || Spacewatch || — || align=right | 1.3 km || 
|-id=606 bgcolor=#E9E9E9
| 277606 ||  || — || January 5, 2006 || Mount Lemmon || Mount Lemmon Survey || HEN || align=right | 1.2 km || 
|-id=607 bgcolor=#E9E9E9
| 277607 ||  || — || January 5, 2006 || Mount Lemmon || Mount Lemmon Survey || — || align=right | 2.5 km || 
|-id=608 bgcolor=#E9E9E9
| 277608 ||  || — || January 4, 2006 || Catalina || CSS || — || align=right | 2.6 km || 
|-id=609 bgcolor=#E9E9E9
| 277609 ||  || — || January 5, 2006 || Mount Lemmon || Mount Lemmon Survey || MAR || align=right | 1.7 km || 
|-id=610 bgcolor=#E9E9E9
| 277610 ||  || — || January 6, 2006 || Kitt Peak || Spacewatch || — || align=right | 1.8 km || 
|-id=611 bgcolor=#E9E9E9
| 277611 ||  || — || January 7, 2006 || Socorro || LINEAR || — || align=right | 1.5 km || 
|-id=612 bgcolor=#E9E9E9
| 277612 ||  || — || January 10, 2006 || Mount Lemmon || Mount Lemmon Survey || — || align=right | 2.3 km || 
|-id=613 bgcolor=#E9E9E9
| 277613 ||  || — || January 5, 2006 || Mount Lemmon || Mount Lemmon Survey || WIT || align=right | 1.1 km || 
|-id=614 bgcolor=#E9E9E9
| 277614 ||  || — || January 20, 2006 || Kitt Peak || Spacewatch || — || align=right | 1.7 km || 
|-id=615 bgcolor=#E9E9E9
| 277615 ||  || — || January 20, 2006 || Catalina || CSS || ADE || align=right | 2.9 km || 
|-id=616 bgcolor=#FFC2E0
| 277616 ||  || — || January 21, 2006 || Siding Spring || SSS || APO +1km || align=right | 1.2 km || 
|-id=617 bgcolor=#FFC2E0
| 277617 ||  || — || January 22, 2006 || Mount Lemmon || Mount Lemmon Survey || APO || align=right data-sort-value="0.67" | 670 m || 
|-id=618 bgcolor=#d6d6d6
| 277618 ||  || — || January 23, 2006 || Piszkéstető || K. Sárneczky || TRP || align=right | 2.8 km || 
|-id=619 bgcolor=#E9E9E9
| 277619 ||  || — || January 22, 2006 || Anderson Mesa || LONEOS || — || align=right | 1.5 km || 
|-id=620 bgcolor=#E9E9E9
| 277620 ||  || — || January 20, 2006 || Kitt Peak || Spacewatch || — || align=right | 4.3 km || 
|-id=621 bgcolor=#E9E9E9
| 277621 ||  || — || January 23, 2006 || Catalina || CSS || — || align=right | 3.8 km || 
|-id=622 bgcolor=#E9E9E9
| 277622 ||  || — || January 23, 2006 || Mount Lemmon || Mount Lemmon Survey || MIS || align=right | 3.2 km || 
|-id=623 bgcolor=#d6d6d6
| 277623 ||  || — || January 20, 2006 || Kitt Peak || Spacewatch || — || align=right | 3.6 km || 
|-id=624 bgcolor=#E9E9E9
| 277624 ||  || — || January 20, 2006 || Kitt Peak || Spacewatch || — || align=right | 3.0 km || 
|-id=625 bgcolor=#E9E9E9
| 277625 ||  || — || January 21, 2006 || Kitt Peak || Spacewatch || — || align=right | 2.7 km || 
|-id=626 bgcolor=#E9E9E9
| 277626 ||  || — || January 23, 2006 || Kitt Peak || Spacewatch || WIT || align=right | 1.1 km || 
|-id=627 bgcolor=#E9E9E9
| 277627 ||  || — || January 20, 2006 || Kitt Peak || Spacewatch || — || align=right | 2.6 km || 
|-id=628 bgcolor=#E9E9E9
| 277628 ||  || — || January 21, 2006 || Mount Lemmon || Mount Lemmon Survey || — || align=right | 1.6 km || 
|-id=629 bgcolor=#E9E9E9
| 277629 ||  || — || January 23, 2006 || Kitt Peak || Spacewatch || — || align=right | 1.5 km || 
|-id=630 bgcolor=#E9E9E9
| 277630 ||  || — || January 23, 2006 || Mount Lemmon || Mount Lemmon Survey || HEN || align=right | 1.2 km || 
|-id=631 bgcolor=#E9E9E9
| 277631 ||  || — || January 22, 2006 || Mount Lemmon || Mount Lemmon Survey || — || align=right | 1.3 km || 
|-id=632 bgcolor=#E9E9E9
| 277632 ||  || — || January 23, 2006 || Kitt Peak || Spacewatch || — || align=right | 1.8 km || 
|-id=633 bgcolor=#d6d6d6
| 277633 ||  || — || January 23, 2006 || Kitt Peak || Spacewatch || — || align=right | 3.3 km || 
|-id=634 bgcolor=#d6d6d6
| 277634 ||  || — || January 23, 2006 || Kitt Peak || Spacewatch || KOR || align=right | 1.2 km || 
|-id=635 bgcolor=#E9E9E9
| 277635 ||  || — || January 23, 2006 || Kitt Peak || Spacewatch || — || align=right | 3.0 km || 
|-id=636 bgcolor=#E9E9E9
| 277636 ||  || — || January 25, 2006 || Kitt Peak || Spacewatch || HEN || align=right | 1.2 km || 
|-id=637 bgcolor=#E9E9E9
| 277637 ||  || — || January 26, 2006 || Kitt Peak || Spacewatch || — || align=right | 1.5 km || 
|-id=638 bgcolor=#E9E9E9
| 277638 ||  || — || January 23, 2006 || Catalina || CSS || — || align=right | 2.3 km || 
|-id=639 bgcolor=#E9E9E9
| 277639 ||  || — || January 23, 2006 || Mount Lemmon || Mount Lemmon Survey || WIT || align=right | 1.5 km || 
|-id=640 bgcolor=#E9E9E9
| 277640 ||  || — || January 25, 2006 || Kitt Peak || Spacewatch || — || align=right | 1.2 km || 
|-id=641 bgcolor=#d6d6d6
| 277641 ||  || — || January 25, 2006 || Kitt Peak || Spacewatch || EOS || align=right | 2.7 km || 
|-id=642 bgcolor=#E9E9E9
| 277642 ||  || — || January 25, 2006 || Kitt Peak || Spacewatch || — || align=right | 1.5 km || 
|-id=643 bgcolor=#E9E9E9
| 277643 ||  || — || January 25, 2006 || Kitt Peak || Spacewatch || DOR || align=right | 2.5 km || 
|-id=644 bgcolor=#E9E9E9
| 277644 ||  || — || January 25, 2006 || Kitt Peak || Spacewatch || HEN || align=right | 1.2 km || 
|-id=645 bgcolor=#E9E9E9
| 277645 ||  || — || January 25, 2006 || Kitt Peak || Spacewatch || — || align=right | 1.6 km || 
|-id=646 bgcolor=#E9E9E9
| 277646 ||  || — || January 26, 2006 || Mount Lemmon || Mount Lemmon Survey || — || align=right | 1.2 km || 
|-id=647 bgcolor=#d6d6d6
| 277647 ||  || — || January 26, 2006 || Kitt Peak || Spacewatch || EOS || align=right | 2.1 km || 
|-id=648 bgcolor=#E9E9E9
| 277648 ||  || — || January 26, 2006 || Kitt Peak || Spacewatch || — || align=right | 2.0 km || 
|-id=649 bgcolor=#E9E9E9
| 277649 ||  || — || January 26, 2006 || Mount Lemmon || Mount Lemmon Survey || — || align=right | 1.6 km || 
|-id=650 bgcolor=#E9E9E9
| 277650 ||  || — || January 26, 2006 || Kitt Peak || Spacewatch || AEO || align=right | 1.3 km || 
|-id=651 bgcolor=#E9E9E9
| 277651 ||  || — || January 26, 2006 || Mount Lemmon || Mount Lemmon Survey || — || align=right | 3.0 km || 
|-id=652 bgcolor=#E9E9E9
| 277652 ||  || — || January 26, 2006 || Kitt Peak || Spacewatch || — || align=right | 2.0 km || 
|-id=653 bgcolor=#E9E9E9
| 277653 ||  || — || January 27, 2006 || Mount Lemmon || Mount Lemmon Survey || — || align=right | 3.9 km || 
|-id=654 bgcolor=#E9E9E9
| 277654 ||  || — || January 21, 2006 || Kitt Peak || Spacewatch || ADE || align=right | 3.7 km || 
|-id=655 bgcolor=#d6d6d6
| 277655 ||  || — || January 25, 2006 || Kitt Peak || Spacewatch || — || align=right | 3.6 km || 
|-id=656 bgcolor=#E9E9E9
| 277656 ||  || — || January 25, 2006 || Kitt Peak || Spacewatch || AST || align=right | 2.7 km || 
|-id=657 bgcolor=#E9E9E9
| 277657 ||  || — || January 24, 2006 || Anderson Mesa || LONEOS || — || align=right | 1.6 km || 
|-id=658 bgcolor=#E9E9E9
| 277658 ||  || — || January 26, 2006 || Kitt Peak || Spacewatch || VIB || align=right | 3.0 km || 
|-id=659 bgcolor=#E9E9E9
| 277659 ||  || — || January 26, 2006 || Mount Lemmon || Mount Lemmon Survey || — || align=right | 1.4 km || 
|-id=660 bgcolor=#d6d6d6
| 277660 ||  || — || January 27, 2006 || Mount Lemmon || Mount Lemmon Survey || KOR || align=right | 1.5 km || 
|-id=661 bgcolor=#E9E9E9
| 277661 ||  || — || January 28, 2006 || Anderson Mesa || LONEOS || — || align=right | 3.5 km || 
|-id=662 bgcolor=#E9E9E9
| 277662 ||  || — || January 30, 2006 || Kitt Peak || Spacewatch || — || align=right | 2.6 km || 
|-id=663 bgcolor=#E9E9E9
| 277663 ||  || — || January 30, 2006 || Kitt Peak || Spacewatch || — || align=right | 2.6 km || 
|-id=664 bgcolor=#d6d6d6
| 277664 ||  || — || January 30, 2006 || Kitt Peak || Spacewatch || — || align=right | 3.2 km || 
|-id=665 bgcolor=#E9E9E9
| 277665 ||  || — || January 30, 2006 || Kitt Peak || Spacewatch || RAF || align=right | 1.1 km || 
|-id=666 bgcolor=#E9E9E9
| 277666 ||  || — || January 31, 2006 || Kitt Peak || Spacewatch || — || align=right | 2.7 km || 
|-id=667 bgcolor=#E9E9E9
| 277667 ||  || — || January 31, 2006 || Kitt Peak || Spacewatch || HEN || align=right | 1.3 km || 
|-id=668 bgcolor=#fefefe
| 277668 ||  || — || January 31, 2006 || Kitt Peak || Spacewatch || ERI || align=right | 1.7 km || 
|-id=669 bgcolor=#E9E9E9
| 277669 ||  || — || January 31, 2006 || Mount Lemmon || Mount Lemmon Survey || RAF || align=right data-sort-value="0.97" | 970 m || 
|-id=670 bgcolor=#d6d6d6
| 277670 ||  || — || January 22, 2006 || Anderson Mesa || LONEOS || — || align=right | 2.9 km || 
|-id=671 bgcolor=#E9E9E9
| 277671 ||  || — || January 23, 2006 || Socorro || LINEAR || — || align=right | 4.5 km || 
|-id=672 bgcolor=#E9E9E9
| 277672 ||  || — || January 24, 2006 || Socorro || LINEAR || — || align=right | 2.7 km || 
|-id=673 bgcolor=#E9E9E9
| 277673 ||  || — || January 27, 2006 || Anderson Mesa || LONEOS || — || align=right | 2.5 km || 
|-id=674 bgcolor=#E9E9E9
| 277674 ||  || — || January 30, 2006 || Kitt Peak || Spacewatch || HEN || align=right | 1.0 km || 
|-id=675 bgcolor=#E9E9E9
| 277675 ||  || — || January 31, 2006 || Kitt Peak || Spacewatch || — || align=right | 1.6 km || 
|-id=676 bgcolor=#d6d6d6
| 277676 ||  || — || January 31, 2006 || Kitt Peak || Spacewatch || 628 || align=right | 2.6 km || 
|-id=677 bgcolor=#E9E9E9
| 277677 ||  || — || January 31, 2006 || Kitt Peak || Spacewatch || — || align=right | 1.9 km || 
|-id=678 bgcolor=#d6d6d6
| 277678 ||  || — || January 31, 2006 || Kitt Peak || Spacewatch || — || align=right | 2.4 km || 
|-id=679 bgcolor=#E9E9E9
| 277679 ||  || — || January 31, 2006 || Kitt Peak || Spacewatch || — || align=right | 2.3 km || 
|-id=680 bgcolor=#E9E9E9
| 277680 ||  || — || January 31, 2006 || Kitt Peak || Spacewatch || HEN || align=right | 1.4 km || 
|-id=681 bgcolor=#E9E9E9
| 277681 ||  || — || January 31, 2006 || Kitt Peak || Spacewatch || — || align=right | 1.9 km || 
|-id=682 bgcolor=#d6d6d6
| 277682 ||  || — || January 31, 2006 || Kitt Peak || Spacewatch || — || align=right | 3.3 km || 
|-id=683 bgcolor=#E9E9E9
| 277683 ||  || — || January 26, 2006 || Catalina || CSS || GEF || align=right | 1.8 km || 
|-id=684 bgcolor=#d6d6d6
| 277684 ||  || — || January 27, 2006 || Anderson Mesa || LONEOS || — || align=right | 4.1 km || 
|-id=685 bgcolor=#fefefe
| 277685 ||  || — || January 31, 2006 || Catalina || CSS || V || align=right data-sort-value="0.97" | 970 m || 
|-id=686 bgcolor=#E9E9E9
| 277686 ||  || — || January 23, 2006 || Mount Lemmon || Mount Lemmon Survey || — || align=right | 1.0 km || 
|-id=687 bgcolor=#d6d6d6
| 277687 ||  || — || January 30, 2006 || Kitt Peak || Spacewatch || KOR || align=right | 1.5 km || 
|-id=688 bgcolor=#E9E9E9
| 277688 ||  || — || January 30, 2006 || Kitt Peak || Spacewatch || AGN || align=right data-sort-value="0.97" | 970 m || 
|-id=689 bgcolor=#E9E9E9
| 277689 ||  || — || January 26, 2006 || Kitt Peak || Spacewatch || — || align=right | 2.1 km || 
|-id=690 bgcolor=#E9E9E9
| 277690 ||  || — || January 27, 2006 || Mount Lemmon || Mount Lemmon Survey || AST || align=right | 2.0 km || 
|-id=691 bgcolor=#E9E9E9
| 277691 ||  || — || February 1, 2006 || Mount Lemmon || Mount Lemmon Survey || — || align=right | 2.1 km || 
|-id=692 bgcolor=#E9E9E9
| 277692 ||  || — || February 1, 2006 || Mount Lemmon || Mount Lemmon Survey || — || align=right | 2.3 km || 
|-id=693 bgcolor=#d6d6d6
| 277693 ||  || — || February 2, 2006 || Kitt Peak || Spacewatch || KOR || align=right | 2.0 km || 
|-id=694 bgcolor=#fefefe
| 277694 ||  || — || February 2, 2006 || Mount Lemmon || Mount Lemmon Survey || NYS || align=right | 1.0 km || 
|-id=695 bgcolor=#E9E9E9
| 277695 ||  || — || February 2, 2006 || Mount Lemmon || Mount Lemmon Survey || — || align=right | 1.6 km || 
|-id=696 bgcolor=#E9E9E9
| 277696 ||  || — || February 2, 2006 || Mount Lemmon || Mount Lemmon Survey || — || align=right | 1.7 km || 
|-id=697 bgcolor=#E9E9E9
| 277697 ||  || — || February 2, 2006 || Kitt Peak || Spacewatch || GEF || align=right | 1.2 km || 
|-id=698 bgcolor=#E9E9E9
| 277698 ||  || — || February 2, 2006 || Mount Lemmon || Mount Lemmon Survey || — || align=right | 2.9 km || 
|-id=699 bgcolor=#fefefe
| 277699 ||  || — || February 3, 2006 || Mount Lemmon || Mount Lemmon Survey || V || align=right data-sort-value="0.86" | 860 m || 
|-id=700 bgcolor=#E9E9E9
| 277700 ||  || — || February 4, 2006 || Mount Lemmon || Mount Lemmon Survey || — || align=right | 2.6 km || 
|}

277701–277800 

|-bgcolor=#E9E9E9
| 277701 ||  || — || February 4, 2006 || Catalina || CSS || MAR || align=right | 2.8 km || 
|-id=702 bgcolor=#d6d6d6
| 277702 ||  || — || February 1, 2006 || Kitt Peak || Spacewatch || — || align=right | 2.8 km || 
|-id=703 bgcolor=#E9E9E9
| 277703 ||  || — || February 2, 2006 || Kitt Peak || Spacewatch || PAD || align=right | 1.7 km || 
|-id=704 bgcolor=#E9E9E9
| 277704 ||  || — || February 20, 2006 || Mayhill || A. Lowe || — || align=right | 3.6 km || 
|-id=705 bgcolor=#E9E9E9
| 277705 ||  || — || February 20, 2006 || Kitt Peak || Spacewatch || — || align=right | 1.9 km || 
|-id=706 bgcolor=#E9E9E9
| 277706 ||  || — || February 20, 2006 || Kitt Peak || Spacewatch || WIT || align=right | 1.5 km || 
|-id=707 bgcolor=#E9E9E9
| 277707 ||  || — || February 22, 2006 || Catalina || CSS || — || align=right | 4.3 km || 
|-id=708 bgcolor=#E9E9E9
| 277708 ||  || — || February 20, 2006 || Kitt Peak || Spacewatch || AGN || align=right | 1.3 km || 
|-id=709 bgcolor=#E9E9E9
| 277709 ||  || — || February 20, 2006 || Socorro || LINEAR || — || align=right | 2.9 km || 
|-id=710 bgcolor=#E9E9E9
| 277710 ||  || — || February 20, 2006 || Kitt Peak || Spacewatch || — || align=right | 2.3 km || 
|-id=711 bgcolor=#E9E9E9
| 277711 ||  || — || February 20, 2006 || Kitt Peak || Spacewatch || HOF || align=right | 3.7 km || 
|-id=712 bgcolor=#E9E9E9
| 277712 ||  || — || February 20, 2006 || Kitt Peak || Spacewatch || MRX || align=right | 1.3 km || 
|-id=713 bgcolor=#E9E9E9
| 277713 ||  || — || February 20, 2006 || Kitt Peak || Spacewatch || MRX || align=right | 1.2 km || 
|-id=714 bgcolor=#E9E9E9
| 277714 ||  || — || February 20, 2006 || Kitt Peak || Spacewatch || — || align=right | 2.6 km || 
|-id=715 bgcolor=#E9E9E9
| 277715 ||  || — || February 20, 2006 || Mount Lemmon || Mount Lemmon Survey || — || align=right | 2.4 km || 
|-id=716 bgcolor=#d6d6d6
| 277716 ||  || — || February 20, 2006 || Mount Lemmon || Mount Lemmon Survey || — || align=right | 2.6 km || 
|-id=717 bgcolor=#d6d6d6
| 277717 ||  || — || February 20, 2006 || Kitt Peak || Spacewatch || — || align=right | 2.8 km || 
|-id=718 bgcolor=#E9E9E9
| 277718 ||  || — || February 20, 2006 || Kitt Peak || Spacewatch || ADE || align=right | 2.5 km || 
|-id=719 bgcolor=#E9E9E9
| 277719 ||  || — || February 20, 2006 || Kitt Peak || Spacewatch || PAD || align=right | 1.9 km || 
|-id=720 bgcolor=#E9E9E9
| 277720 ||  || — || February 21, 2006 || Catalina || CSS || DOR || align=right | 3.2 km || 
|-id=721 bgcolor=#E9E9E9
| 277721 ||  || — || February 23, 2006 || Kitt Peak || Spacewatch || — || align=right | 3.6 km || 
|-id=722 bgcolor=#E9E9E9
| 277722 ||  || — || February 24, 2006 || Kitt Peak || Spacewatch || — || align=right | 1.9 km || 
|-id=723 bgcolor=#E9E9E9
| 277723 ||  || — || February 24, 2006 || Mount Lemmon || Mount Lemmon Survey || NEM || align=right | 2.7 km || 
|-id=724 bgcolor=#d6d6d6
| 277724 ||  || — || February 24, 2006 || Mount Lemmon || Mount Lemmon Survey || — || align=right | 2.2 km || 
|-id=725 bgcolor=#E9E9E9
| 277725 ||  || — || February 24, 2006 || Mount Lemmon || Mount Lemmon Survey || — || align=right | 2.4 km || 
|-id=726 bgcolor=#d6d6d6
| 277726 ||  || — || February 25, 2006 || Mayhill || A. Lowe || EUP || align=right | 5.9 km || 
|-id=727 bgcolor=#E9E9E9
| 277727 ||  || — || February 21, 2006 || Mount Lemmon || Mount Lemmon Survey || — || align=right | 2.8 km || 
|-id=728 bgcolor=#E9E9E9
| 277728 ||  || — || February 24, 2006 || Kitt Peak || Spacewatch || DOR || align=right | 2.6 km || 
|-id=729 bgcolor=#E9E9E9
| 277729 ||  || — || February 24, 2006 || Kitt Peak || Spacewatch || — || align=right | 2.6 km || 
|-id=730 bgcolor=#d6d6d6
| 277730 ||  || — || February 24, 2006 || Kitt Peak || Spacewatch || — || align=right | 3.0 km || 
|-id=731 bgcolor=#E9E9E9
| 277731 ||  || — || February 24, 2006 || Kitt Peak || Spacewatch || NEM || align=right | 3.0 km || 
|-id=732 bgcolor=#E9E9E9
| 277732 ||  || — || February 24, 2006 || Kitt Peak || Spacewatch || WIT || align=right | 1.3 km || 
|-id=733 bgcolor=#d6d6d6
| 277733 ||  || — || February 24, 2006 || Kitt Peak || Spacewatch || EOS || align=right | 1.9 km || 
|-id=734 bgcolor=#d6d6d6
| 277734 ||  || — || February 24, 2006 || Kitt Peak || Spacewatch || CHA || align=right | 1.9 km || 
|-id=735 bgcolor=#E9E9E9
| 277735 ||  || — || February 24, 2006 || Kitt Peak || Spacewatch || — || align=right | 2.8 km || 
|-id=736 bgcolor=#E9E9E9
| 277736 ||  || — || February 24, 2006 || Kitt Peak || Spacewatch || AST || align=right | 2.2 km || 
|-id=737 bgcolor=#d6d6d6
| 277737 ||  || — || February 24, 2006 || Kitt Peak || Spacewatch || — || align=right | 3.4 km || 
|-id=738 bgcolor=#E9E9E9
| 277738 ||  || — || February 24, 2006 || Kitt Peak || Spacewatch || — || align=right | 2.7 km || 
|-id=739 bgcolor=#d6d6d6
| 277739 ||  || — || February 24, 2006 || Kitt Peak || Spacewatch || — || align=right | 6.3 km || 
|-id=740 bgcolor=#E9E9E9
| 277740 ||  || — || February 25, 2006 || Kitt Peak || Spacewatch || AGN || align=right | 1.4 km || 
|-id=741 bgcolor=#E9E9E9
| 277741 ||  || — || February 25, 2006 || Kitt Peak || Spacewatch || — || align=right | 2.2 km || 
|-id=742 bgcolor=#d6d6d6
| 277742 ||  || — || February 25, 2006 || Kitt Peak || Spacewatch || — || align=right | 3.1 km || 
|-id=743 bgcolor=#E9E9E9
| 277743 ||  || — || February 25, 2006 || Mount Lemmon || Mount Lemmon Survey || — || align=right | 2.9 km || 
|-id=744 bgcolor=#fefefe
| 277744 ||  || — || February 25, 2006 || Kitt Peak || Spacewatch || — || align=right | 1.1 km || 
|-id=745 bgcolor=#E9E9E9
| 277745 ||  || — || February 25, 2006 || Mount Lemmon || Mount Lemmon Survey || — || align=right | 2.7 km || 
|-id=746 bgcolor=#d6d6d6
| 277746 ||  || — || February 25, 2006 || Kitt Peak || Spacewatch || HYG || align=right | 4.0 km || 
|-id=747 bgcolor=#E9E9E9
| 277747 ||  || — || February 25, 2006 || Kitt Peak || Spacewatch || MRX || align=right | 1.3 km || 
|-id=748 bgcolor=#E9E9E9
| 277748 ||  || — || February 25, 2006 || Kitt Peak || Spacewatch || HNA || align=right | 2.8 km || 
|-id=749 bgcolor=#d6d6d6
| 277749 ||  || — || February 26, 2006 || Anderson Mesa || LONEOS || EUP || align=right | 3.8 km || 
|-id=750 bgcolor=#E9E9E9
| 277750 ||  || — || February 27, 2006 || Catalina || CSS || — || align=right | 3.5 km || 
|-id=751 bgcolor=#E9E9E9
| 277751 ||  || — || February 22, 2006 || Catalina || CSS || — || align=right | 2.6 km || 
|-id=752 bgcolor=#E9E9E9
| 277752 ||  || — || February 25, 2006 || Kitt Peak || Spacewatch || — || align=right | 2.9 km || 
|-id=753 bgcolor=#E9E9E9
| 277753 ||  || — || February 25, 2006 || Kitt Peak || Spacewatch || HOF || align=right | 3.8 km || 
|-id=754 bgcolor=#E9E9E9
| 277754 ||  || — || February 25, 2006 || Kitt Peak || Spacewatch || WIT || align=right | 1.1 km || 
|-id=755 bgcolor=#E9E9E9
| 277755 ||  || — || February 25, 2006 || Kitt Peak || Spacewatch || — || align=right | 2.5 km || 
|-id=756 bgcolor=#E9E9E9
| 277756 ||  || — || February 25, 2006 || Kitt Peak || Spacewatch || — || align=right | 2.1 km || 
|-id=757 bgcolor=#E9E9E9
| 277757 ||  || — || February 25, 2006 || Kitt Peak || Spacewatch || — || align=right | 2.7 km || 
|-id=758 bgcolor=#d6d6d6
| 277758 ||  || — || February 25, 2006 || Kitt Peak || Spacewatch || — || align=right | 2.7 km || 
|-id=759 bgcolor=#E9E9E9
| 277759 ||  || — || February 25, 2006 || Kitt Peak || Spacewatch || — || align=right | 2.1 km || 
|-id=760 bgcolor=#d6d6d6
| 277760 ||  || — || February 25, 2006 || Kitt Peak || Spacewatch || HYG || align=right | 3.0 km || 
|-id=761 bgcolor=#E9E9E9
| 277761 ||  || — || February 25, 2006 || Mount Lemmon || Mount Lemmon Survey || AST || align=right | 2.8 km || 
|-id=762 bgcolor=#d6d6d6
| 277762 ||  || — || February 25, 2006 || Kitt Peak || Spacewatch || CHA || align=right | 2.5 km || 
|-id=763 bgcolor=#E9E9E9
| 277763 ||  || — || February 25, 2006 || Kitt Peak || Spacewatch || DOR || align=right | 3.4 km || 
|-id=764 bgcolor=#d6d6d6
| 277764 ||  || — || February 27, 2006 || Kitt Peak || Spacewatch || — || align=right | 3.8 km || 
|-id=765 bgcolor=#E9E9E9
| 277765 ||  || — || February 27, 2006 || Kitt Peak || Spacewatch || — || align=right | 2.7 km || 
|-id=766 bgcolor=#E9E9E9
| 277766 ||  || — || February 27, 2006 || Kitt Peak || Spacewatch || — || align=right | 1.8 km || 
|-id=767 bgcolor=#d6d6d6
| 277767 ||  || — || February 27, 2006 || Kitt Peak || Spacewatch || EOS || align=right | 1.5 km || 
|-id=768 bgcolor=#E9E9E9
| 277768 ||  || — || February 27, 2006 || Mount Lemmon || Mount Lemmon Survey || AGN || align=right | 1.5 km || 
|-id=769 bgcolor=#E9E9E9
| 277769 ||  || — || February 27, 2006 || Kitt Peak || Spacewatch || — || align=right | 2.9 km || 
|-id=770 bgcolor=#E9E9E9
| 277770 ||  || — || February 27, 2006 || Mount Lemmon || Mount Lemmon Survey || — || align=right | 2.9 km || 
|-id=771 bgcolor=#E9E9E9
| 277771 ||  || — || February 27, 2006 || Mount Lemmon || Mount Lemmon Survey || — || align=right | 2.4 km || 
|-id=772 bgcolor=#d6d6d6
| 277772 ||  || — || February 27, 2006 || Kitt Peak || Spacewatch || — || align=right | 3.3 km || 
|-id=773 bgcolor=#d6d6d6
| 277773 ||  || — || February 27, 2006 || Kitt Peak || Spacewatch || KOR || align=right | 1.5 km || 
|-id=774 bgcolor=#E9E9E9
| 277774 ||  || — || February 27, 2006 || Kitt Peak || Spacewatch || HEN || align=right | 1.6 km || 
|-id=775 bgcolor=#E9E9E9
| 277775 ||  || — || February 27, 2006 || Mount Lemmon || Mount Lemmon Survey || HOF || align=right | 2.8 km || 
|-id=776 bgcolor=#d6d6d6
| 277776 ||  || — || February 24, 2006 || Catalina || CSS || — || align=right | 8.4 km || 
|-id=777 bgcolor=#fefefe
| 277777 ||  || — || February 22, 2006 || Anderson Mesa || LONEOS || — || align=right | 1.1 km || 
|-id=778 bgcolor=#E9E9E9
| 277778 ||  || — || February 24, 2006 || Catalina || CSS || — || align=right | 3.5 km || 
|-id=779 bgcolor=#E9E9E9
| 277779 ||  || — || February 27, 2006 || Catalina || CSS || EUN || align=right | 1.8 km || 
|-id=780 bgcolor=#E9E9E9
| 277780 ||  || — || February 25, 2006 || Kitt Peak || Spacewatch || HOF || align=right | 2.9 km || 
|-id=781 bgcolor=#E9E9E9
| 277781 ||  || — || February 27, 2006 || Kitt Peak || Spacewatch || MRX || align=right | 1.3 km || 
|-id=782 bgcolor=#E9E9E9
| 277782 ||  || — || February 24, 2006 || Kitt Peak || Spacewatch || — || align=right | 2.0 km || 
|-id=783 bgcolor=#E9E9E9
| 277783 ||  || — || February 24, 2006 || Kitt Peak || Spacewatch || AGN || align=right | 1.2 km || 
|-id=784 bgcolor=#d6d6d6
| 277784 ||  || — || February 24, 2006 || Mount Lemmon || Mount Lemmon Survey || — || align=right | 3.2 km || 
|-id=785 bgcolor=#d6d6d6
| 277785 ||  || — || February 24, 2006 || Mount Lemmon || Mount Lemmon Survey || — || align=right | 3.1 km || 
|-id=786 bgcolor=#E9E9E9
| 277786 ||  || — || February 25, 2006 || Kitt Peak || Spacewatch || WIT || align=right | 1.1 km || 
|-id=787 bgcolor=#E9E9E9
| 277787 ||  || — || February 24, 2006 || Mount Lemmon || Mount Lemmon Survey || HOF || align=right | 3.4 km || 
|-id=788 bgcolor=#d6d6d6
| 277788 ||  || — || March 3, 2006 || Nyukasa || Mount Nyukasa Stn. || KOR || align=right | 1.6 km || 
|-id=789 bgcolor=#d6d6d6
| 277789 ||  || — || March 2, 2006 || Kitt Peak || Spacewatch || KOR || align=right | 1.3 km || 
|-id=790 bgcolor=#E9E9E9
| 277790 ||  || — || March 2, 2006 || Kitt Peak || Spacewatch || NEM || align=right | 3.0 km || 
|-id=791 bgcolor=#E9E9E9
| 277791 ||  || — || March 2, 2006 || Kitt Peak || Spacewatch || — || align=right | 3.6 km || 
|-id=792 bgcolor=#E9E9E9
| 277792 ||  || — || March 2, 2006 || Kitt Peak || Spacewatch || AGN || align=right | 1.7 km || 
|-id=793 bgcolor=#E9E9E9
| 277793 ||  || — || March 3, 2006 || Kitt Peak || Spacewatch || HEN || align=right | 1.2 km || 
|-id=794 bgcolor=#E9E9E9
| 277794 ||  || — || March 3, 2006 || Kitt Peak || Spacewatch || AGN || align=right | 1.4 km || 
|-id=795 bgcolor=#E9E9E9
| 277795 ||  || — || March 3, 2006 || Kitt Peak || Spacewatch || — || align=right | 2.9 km || 
|-id=796 bgcolor=#E9E9E9
| 277796 ||  || — || March 3, 2006 || Nyukasa || Mount Nyukasa Stn. || HEN || align=right | 1.4 km || 
|-id=797 bgcolor=#E9E9E9
| 277797 ||  || — || March 5, 2006 || Kitt Peak || Spacewatch || GEF || align=right | 1.4 km || 
|-id=798 bgcolor=#E9E9E9
| 277798 ||  || — || March 5, 2006 || Kitt Peak || Spacewatch || — || align=right | 2.5 km || 
|-id=799 bgcolor=#E9E9E9
| 277799 ||  || — || March 2, 2006 || Kitt Peak || Spacewatch || — || align=right | 2.1 km || 
|-id=800 bgcolor=#d6d6d6
| 277800 ||  || — || March 5, 2006 || Kitt Peak || Spacewatch || 7:4 || align=right | 6.8 km || 
|}

277801–277900 

|-bgcolor=#E9E9E9
| 277801 ||  || — || March 23, 2006 || Mount Lemmon || Mount Lemmon Survey || — || align=right | 2.6 km || 
|-id=802 bgcolor=#d6d6d6
| 277802 ||  || — || March 23, 2006 || Catalina || CSS || — || align=right | 4.2 km || 
|-id=803 bgcolor=#d6d6d6
| 277803 ||  || — || March 23, 2006 || Kitt Peak || Spacewatch || — || align=right | 4.0 km || 
|-id=804 bgcolor=#E9E9E9
| 277804 ||  || — || March 23, 2006 || Mount Lemmon || Mount Lemmon Survey || AST || align=right | 3.0 km || 
|-id=805 bgcolor=#d6d6d6
| 277805 ||  || — || March 23, 2006 || Mount Lemmon || Mount Lemmon Survey || — || align=right | 2.7 km || 
|-id=806 bgcolor=#E9E9E9
| 277806 ||  || — || March 24, 2006 || Kitt Peak || Spacewatch || — || align=right | 2.7 km || 
|-id=807 bgcolor=#d6d6d6
| 277807 ||  || — || March 24, 2006 || Kitt Peak || Spacewatch || — || align=right | 5.1 km || 
|-id=808 bgcolor=#d6d6d6
| 277808 ||  || — || March 24, 2006 || Kitt Peak || Spacewatch || — || align=right | 2.6 km || 
|-id=809 bgcolor=#d6d6d6
| 277809 ||  || — || March 25, 2006 || Mount Lemmon || Mount Lemmon Survey || EOS || align=right | 2.3 km || 
|-id=810 bgcolor=#FFC2E0
| 277810 ||  || — || March 29, 2006 || Kitt Peak || Spacewatch || APO || align=right data-sort-value="0.16" | 160 m || 
|-id=811 bgcolor=#d6d6d6
| 277811 ||  || — || March 30, 2006 || Lulin Observatory || Q.-z. Ye || — || align=right | 3.0 km || 
|-id=812 bgcolor=#E9E9E9
| 277812 ||  || — || March 23, 2006 || Kitt Peak || Spacewatch || — || align=right | 3.7 km || 
|-id=813 bgcolor=#d6d6d6
| 277813 ||  || — || March 26, 2006 || Anderson Mesa || LONEOS || HYG || align=right | 4.0 km || 
|-id=814 bgcolor=#d6d6d6
| 277814 ||  || — || March 24, 2006 || Kitt Peak || Spacewatch || — || align=right | 2.2 km || 
|-id=815 bgcolor=#E9E9E9
| 277815 ||  || — || March 23, 2006 || Mount Lemmon || Mount Lemmon Survey || — || align=right | 2.7 km || 
|-id=816 bgcolor=#fefefe
| 277816 Varese || 2006 GL ||  || April 2, 2006 || Schiaparelli || L. Buzzi, F. Luppi || H || align=right data-sort-value="0.59" | 590 m || 
|-id=817 bgcolor=#d6d6d6
| 277817 ||  || — || April 2, 2006 || Piszkéstető || K. Sárneczky || — || align=right | 3.7 km || 
|-id=818 bgcolor=#d6d6d6
| 277818 ||  || — || April 2, 2006 || Kitt Peak || Spacewatch || KOR || align=right | 1.5 km || 
|-id=819 bgcolor=#d6d6d6
| 277819 ||  || — || April 2, 2006 || Kitt Peak || Spacewatch || KOR || align=right | 1.3 km || 
|-id=820 bgcolor=#d6d6d6
| 277820 ||  || — || April 2, 2006 || Kitt Peak || Spacewatch || — || align=right | 2.7 km || 
|-id=821 bgcolor=#d6d6d6
| 277821 ||  || — || April 2, 2006 || Catalina || CSS || — || align=right | 6.3 km || 
|-id=822 bgcolor=#E9E9E9
| 277822 ||  || — || April 7, 2006 || Mount Lemmon || Mount Lemmon Survey || AEO || align=right | 1.5 km || 
|-id=823 bgcolor=#d6d6d6
| 277823 ||  || — || April 2, 2006 || Anderson Mesa || LONEOS || — || align=right | 6.2 km || 
|-id=824 bgcolor=#d6d6d6
| 277824 ||  || — || April 18, 2006 || Catalina || CSS || — || align=right | 4.7 km || 
|-id=825 bgcolor=#d6d6d6
| 277825 ||  || — || April 18, 2006 || Kitt Peak || Spacewatch || NAE || align=right | 3.2 km || 
|-id=826 bgcolor=#d6d6d6
| 277826 ||  || — || April 19, 2006 || Kitt Peak || Spacewatch || TRE || align=right | 4.2 km || 
|-id=827 bgcolor=#d6d6d6
| 277827 ||  || — || April 19, 2006 || Mount Lemmon || Mount Lemmon Survey || — || align=right | 2.4 km || 
|-id=828 bgcolor=#d6d6d6
| 277828 ||  || — || April 20, 2006 || Kitt Peak || Spacewatch || KOR || align=right | 1.4 km || 
|-id=829 bgcolor=#E9E9E9
| 277829 ||  || — || April 20, 2006 || Kitt Peak || Spacewatch || — || align=right | 2.7 km || 
|-id=830 bgcolor=#FFC2E0
| 277830 ||  || — || April 24, 2006 || Siding Spring || SSS || ATEcritical || align=right data-sort-value="0.26" | 260 m || 
|-id=831 bgcolor=#E9E9E9
| 277831 ||  || — || April 21, 2006 || Kitt Peak || Spacewatch || — || align=right | 3.3 km || 
|-id=832 bgcolor=#E9E9E9
| 277832 ||  || — || April 21, 2006 || Kitt Peak || Spacewatch || — || align=right | 2.2 km || 
|-id=833 bgcolor=#d6d6d6
| 277833 ||  || — || April 25, 2006 || Kitt Peak || Spacewatch || KOR || align=right | 1.6 km || 
|-id=834 bgcolor=#fefefe
| 277834 ||  || — || April 26, 2006 || Catalina || CSS || H || align=right data-sort-value="0.69" | 690 m || 
|-id=835 bgcolor=#d6d6d6
| 277835 ||  || — || April 26, 2006 || Anderson Mesa || LONEOS || — || align=right | 3.3 km || 
|-id=836 bgcolor=#d6d6d6
| 277836 ||  || — || April 24, 2006 || Kitt Peak || Spacewatch || KOR || align=right | 1.5 km || 
|-id=837 bgcolor=#d6d6d6
| 277837 ||  || — || April 24, 2006 || Kitt Peak || Spacewatch || — || align=right | 2.8 km || 
|-id=838 bgcolor=#d6d6d6
| 277838 ||  || — || April 24, 2006 || Mount Lemmon || Mount Lemmon Survey || — || align=right | 3.9 km || 
|-id=839 bgcolor=#d6d6d6
| 277839 ||  || — || April 25, 2006 || Kitt Peak || Spacewatch || — || align=right | 4.0 km || 
|-id=840 bgcolor=#d6d6d6
| 277840 ||  || — || April 25, 2006 || Kitt Peak || Spacewatch || EOS || align=right | 1.9 km || 
|-id=841 bgcolor=#d6d6d6
| 277841 ||  || — || April 26, 2006 || Kitt Peak || Spacewatch || — || align=right | 3.5 km || 
|-id=842 bgcolor=#d6d6d6
| 277842 ||  || — || April 26, 2006 || Kitt Peak || Spacewatch || — || align=right | 5.4 km || 
|-id=843 bgcolor=#fefefe
| 277843 ||  || — || April 27, 2006 || Kitt Peak || Spacewatch || NYS || align=right data-sort-value="0.67" | 670 m || 
|-id=844 bgcolor=#d6d6d6
| 277844 ||  || — || April 29, 2006 || Kitt Peak || Spacewatch || HYG || align=right | 3.4 km || 
|-id=845 bgcolor=#d6d6d6
| 277845 ||  || — || April 29, 2006 || Kitt Peak || Spacewatch || EOS || align=right | 2.2 km || 
|-id=846 bgcolor=#E9E9E9
| 277846 ||  || — || April 30, 2006 || Kitt Peak || Spacewatch || — || align=right | 3.3 km || 
|-id=847 bgcolor=#d6d6d6
| 277847 ||  || — || April 30, 2006 || Kitt Peak || Spacewatch || EOS || align=right | 2.5 km || 
|-id=848 bgcolor=#d6d6d6
| 277848 ||  || — || April 30, 2006 || Kitt Peak || Spacewatch || — || align=right | 3.1 km || 
|-id=849 bgcolor=#d6d6d6
| 277849 ||  || — || April 18, 2006 || Catalina || CSS || — || align=right | 3.3 km || 
|-id=850 bgcolor=#d6d6d6
| 277850 ||  || — || April 30, 2006 || Kitt Peak || Spacewatch || — || align=right | 4.0 km || 
|-id=851 bgcolor=#E9E9E9
| 277851 ||  || — || April 25, 2006 || Kitt Peak || Spacewatch || PAD || align=right | 3.2 km || 
|-id=852 bgcolor=#d6d6d6
| 277852 ||  || — || April 30, 2006 || Kitt Peak || Spacewatch || — || align=right | 3.3 km || 
|-id=853 bgcolor=#fefefe
| 277853 ||  || — || April 27, 2006 || Catalina || CSS || H || align=right | 1.1 km || 
|-id=854 bgcolor=#d6d6d6
| 277854 ||  || — || April 26, 2006 || Cerro Tololo || M. W. Buie || — || align=right | 4.2 km || 
|-id=855 bgcolor=#E9E9E9
| 277855 ||  || — || April 22, 2006 || La Silla || R. Behrend || — || align=right | 2.7 km || 
|-id=856 bgcolor=#d6d6d6
| 277856 ||  || — || May 1, 2006 || Kitt Peak || Spacewatch || — || align=right | 3.5 km || 
|-id=857 bgcolor=#d6d6d6
| 277857 ||  || — || May 1, 2006 || Kitt Peak || Spacewatch || — || align=right | 2.5 km || 
|-id=858 bgcolor=#d6d6d6
| 277858 ||  || — || May 1, 2006 || Kitt Peak || Spacewatch || EOS || align=right | 2.0 km || 
|-id=859 bgcolor=#d6d6d6
| 277859 ||  || — || May 4, 2006 || Kitt Peak || Spacewatch || — || align=right | 2.8 km || 
|-id=860 bgcolor=#d6d6d6
| 277860 ||  || — || May 2, 2006 || Mount Lemmon || Mount Lemmon Survey || — || align=right | 3.4 km || 
|-id=861 bgcolor=#d6d6d6
| 277861 ||  || — || May 2, 2006 || Mount Lemmon || Mount Lemmon Survey || — || align=right | 2.8 km || 
|-id=862 bgcolor=#d6d6d6
| 277862 ||  || — || May 2, 2006 || Kitt Peak || Spacewatch || EOS || align=right | 2.2 km || 
|-id=863 bgcolor=#d6d6d6
| 277863 ||  || — || May 2, 2006 || Kitt Peak || Spacewatch || — || align=right | 3.3 km || 
|-id=864 bgcolor=#d6d6d6
| 277864 ||  || — || May 3, 2006 || Mount Lemmon || Mount Lemmon Survey || — || align=right | 3.0 km || 
|-id=865 bgcolor=#d6d6d6
| 277865 ||  || — || May 2, 2006 || Mount Lemmon || Mount Lemmon Survey || TEL || align=right | 1.7 km || 
|-id=866 bgcolor=#d6d6d6
| 277866 ||  || — || May 3, 2006 || Kitt Peak || Spacewatch || — || align=right | 3.6 km || 
|-id=867 bgcolor=#d6d6d6
| 277867 ||  || — || May 4, 2006 || Kitt Peak || Spacewatch || — || align=right | 4.7 km || 
|-id=868 bgcolor=#d6d6d6
| 277868 ||  || — || May 4, 2006 || Kitt Peak || Spacewatch || EOS || align=right | 2.1 km || 
|-id=869 bgcolor=#d6d6d6
| 277869 ||  || — || May 4, 2006 || Kitt Peak || Spacewatch || — || align=right | 4.1 km || 
|-id=870 bgcolor=#d6d6d6
| 277870 ||  || — || May 4, 2006 || Kitt Peak || Spacewatch || EOS || align=right | 2.1 km || 
|-id=871 bgcolor=#d6d6d6
| 277871 ||  || — || May 4, 2006 || Kitt Peak || Spacewatch || — || align=right | 2.7 km || 
|-id=872 bgcolor=#d6d6d6
| 277872 ||  || — || May 5, 2006 || Kitt Peak || Spacewatch || — || align=right | 2.8 km || 
|-id=873 bgcolor=#d6d6d6
| 277873 ||  || — || May 6, 2006 || Kitt Peak || Spacewatch || EOS || align=right | 2.6 km || 
|-id=874 bgcolor=#d6d6d6
| 277874 ||  || — || May 4, 2006 || Kitt Peak || Spacewatch || — || align=right | 4.4 km || 
|-id=875 bgcolor=#d6d6d6
| 277875 ||  || — || May 1, 2006 || Kitt Peak || Spacewatch || — || align=right | 4.1 km || 
|-id=876 bgcolor=#d6d6d6
| 277876 ||  || — || May 2, 2006 || Mount Lemmon || Mount Lemmon Survey || — || align=right | 2.4 km || 
|-id=877 bgcolor=#d6d6d6
| 277877 ||  || — || May 8, 2006 || Mount Lemmon || Mount Lemmon Survey || — || align=right | 4.0 km || 
|-id=878 bgcolor=#d6d6d6
| 277878 ||  || — || May 9, 2006 || Mount Lemmon || Mount Lemmon Survey || — || align=right | 3.3 km || 
|-id=879 bgcolor=#d6d6d6
| 277879 ||  || — || May 1, 2006 || Catalina || CSS || BRA || align=right | 1.9 km || 
|-id=880 bgcolor=#d6d6d6
| 277880 ||  || — || May 1, 2006 || Kitt Peak || M. W. Buie || EOS || align=right | 1.7 km || 
|-id=881 bgcolor=#E9E9E9
| 277881 ||  || — || May 1, 2006 || Kitt Peak || M. W. Buie || — || align=right | 2.7 km || 
|-id=882 bgcolor=#d6d6d6
| 277882 ||  || — || May 1, 2006 || Kitt Peak || M. W. Buie || — || align=right | 3.0 km || 
|-id=883 bgcolor=#d6d6d6
| 277883 Basu ||  ||  || May 1, 2006 || Mauna Kea || P. A. Wiegert || — || align=right | 3.0 km || 
|-id=884 bgcolor=#d6d6d6
| 277884 ||  || — || May 19, 2006 || Mount Lemmon || Mount Lemmon Survey || — || align=right | 4.1 km || 
|-id=885 bgcolor=#d6d6d6
| 277885 ||  || — || May 19, 2006 || Mount Lemmon || Mount Lemmon Survey || — || align=right | 3.7 km || 
|-id=886 bgcolor=#d6d6d6
| 277886 ||  || — || May 19, 2006 || Mount Lemmon || Mount Lemmon Survey || — || align=right | 3.8 km || 
|-id=887 bgcolor=#d6d6d6
| 277887 ||  || — || May 20, 2006 || Catalina || CSS || ALA || align=right | 4.0 km || 
|-id=888 bgcolor=#d6d6d6
| 277888 ||  || — || May 21, 2006 || Kitt Peak || Spacewatch || TRP || align=right | 3.3 km || 
|-id=889 bgcolor=#d6d6d6
| 277889 ||  || — || May 20, 2006 || Kitt Peak || Spacewatch || — || align=right | 3.2 km || 
|-id=890 bgcolor=#d6d6d6
| 277890 ||  || — || May 20, 2006 || Kitt Peak || Spacewatch || KOR || align=right | 1.5 km || 
|-id=891 bgcolor=#d6d6d6
| 277891 ||  || — || May 20, 2006 || Kitt Peak || Spacewatch || — || align=right | 2.3 km || 
|-id=892 bgcolor=#d6d6d6
| 277892 ||  || — || May 20, 2006 || Kitt Peak || Spacewatch || — || align=right | 3.2 km || 
|-id=893 bgcolor=#d6d6d6
| 277893 ||  || — || May 18, 2006 || Palomar || NEAT || — || align=right | 4.3 km || 
|-id=894 bgcolor=#d6d6d6
| 277894 ||  || — || October 15, 2002 || Palomar || NEAT || — || align=right | 4.0 km || 
|-id=895 bgcolor=#d6d6d6
| 277895 ||  || — || May 21, 2006 || Kitt Peak || Spacewatch || VER || align=right | 4.6 km || 
|-id=896 bgcolor=#d6d6d6
| 277896 ||  || — || May 21, 2006 || Mount Lemmon || Mount Lemmon Survey || THM || align=right | 2.9 km || 
|-id=897 bgcolor=#d6d6d6
| 277897 ||  || — || May 21, 2006 || Mount Lemmon || Mount Lemmon Survey || — || align=right | 3.7 km || 
|-id=898 bgcolor=#d6d6d6
| 277898 ||  || — || May 21, 2006 || Kitt Peak || Spacewatch || — || align=right | 3.1 km || 
|-id=899 bgcolor=#E9E9E9
| 277899 ||  || — || May 21, 2006 || Kitt Peak || Spacewatch || — || align=right | 1.9 km || 
|-id=900 bgcolor=#d6d6d6
| 277900 ||  || — || May 21, 2006 || Kitt Peak || Spacewatch || — || align=right | 4.3 km || 
|}

277901–278000 

|-bgcolor=#d6d6d6
| 277901 ||  || — || May 21, 2006 || Kitt Peak || Spacewatch || — || align=right | 4.3 km || 
|-id=902 bgcolor=#d6d6d6
| 277902 ||  || — || May 22, 2006 || Kitt Peak || Spacewatch || — || align=right | 3.1 km || 
|-id=903 bgcolor=#d6d6d6
| 277903 ||  || — || May 22, 2006 || Kitt Peak || Spacewatch || EOS || align=right | 1.9 km || 
|-id=904 bgcolor=#d6d6d6
| 277904 ||  || — || May 24, 2006 || Mount Lemmon || Mount Lemmon Survey || — || align=right | 3.5 km || 
|-id=905 bgcolor=#d6d6d6
| 277905 ||  || — || May 22, 2006 || Kitt Peak || Spacewatch || — || align=right | 3.6 km || 
|-id=906 bgcolor=#d6d6d6
| 277906 ||  || — || May 22, 2006 || Kitt Peak || Spacewatch || — || align=right | 2.8 km || 
|-id=907 bgcolor=#d6d6d6
| 277907 ||  || — || May 23, 2006 || Kitt Peak || Spacewatch || — || align=right | 3.2 km || 
|-id=908 bgcolor=#d6d6d6
| 277908 ||  || — || May 23, 2006 || Kitt Peak || Spacewatch || EOS || align=right | 2.1 km || 
|-id=909 bgcolor=#d6d6d6
| 277909 ||  || — || May 23, 2006 || Kitt Peak || Spacewatch || EMA || align=right | 3.5 km || 
|-id=910 bgcolor=#d6d6d6
| 277910 ||  || — || May 23, 2006 || Kitt Peak || Spacewatch || EOS || align=right | 2.0 km || 
|-id=911 bgcolor=#d6d6d6
| 277911 ||  || — || May 24, 2006 || Mount Lemmon || Mount Lemmon Survey || — || align=right | 3.4 km || 
|-id=912 bgcolor=#d6d6d6
| 277912 ||  || — || May 20, 2006 || Catalina || CSS || — || align=right | 3.4 km || 
|-id=913 bgcolor=#d6d6d6
| 277913 ||  || — || May 24, 2006 || Kitt Peak || Spacewatch || THM || align=right | 2.4 km || 
|-id=914 bgcolor=#d6d6d6
| 277914 ||  || — || May 24, 2006 || Kitt Peak || Spacewatch || — || align=right | 3.3 km || 
|-id=915 bgcolor=#d6d6d6
| 277915 ||  || — || May 24, 2006 || Kitt Peak || Spacewatch || HYG || align=right | 3.8 km || 
|-id=916 bgcolor=#d6d6d6
| 277916 ||  || — || May 25, 2006 || Kitt Peak || Spacewatch || — || align=right | 4.3 km || 
|-id=917 bgcolor=#d6d6d6
| 277917 ||  || — || May 25, 2006 || Kitt Peak || Spacewatch || — || align=right | 3.9 km || 
|-id=918 bgcolor=#d6d6d6
| 277918 ||  || — || May 25, 2006 || Palomar || NEAT || ALA || align=right | 7.6 km || 
|-id=919 bgcolor=#d6d6d6
| 277919 ||  || — || May 26, 2006 || Mount Lemmon || Mount Lemmon Survey || — || align=right | 3.0 km || 
|-id=920 bgcolor=#d6d6d6
| 277920 ||  || — || May 26, 2006 || Kitt Peak || Spacewatch || — || align=right | 3.3 km || 
|-id=921 bgcolor=#d6d6d6
| 277921 ||  || — || May 27, 2006 || Kitt Peak || Spacewatch || EOS || align=right | 2.2 km || 
|-id=922 bgcolor=#fefefe
| 277922 ||  || — || May 27, 2006 || Kitt Peak || Spacewatch || H || align=right data-sort-value="0.59" | 590 m || 
|-id=923 bgcolor=#fefefe
| 277923 ||  || — || May 29, 2006 || Reedy Creek || J. Broughton || H || align=right data-sort-value="0.88" | 880 m || 
|-id=924 bgcolor=#d6d6d6
| 277924 ||  || — || May 28, 2006 || Kitt Peak || Spacewatch || EOS || align=right | 2.3 km || 
|-id=925 bgcolor=#d6d6d6
| 277925 ||  || — || May 28, 2006 || Kitt Peak || Spacewatch || EUP || align=right | 3.6 km || 
|-id=926 bgcolor=#d6d6d6
| 277926 ||  || — || May 31, 2006 || Mount Lemmon || Mount Lemmon Survey || — || align=right | 4.1 km || 
|-id=927 bgcolor=#d6d6d6
| 277927 ||  || — || May 19, 2006 || Anderson Mesa || LONEOS || — || align=right | 3.5 km || 
|-id=928 bgcolor=#d6d6d6
| 277928 ||  || — || May 22, 2006 || Siding Spring || SSS || — || align=right | 3.5 km || 
|-id=929 bgcolor=#d6d6d6
| 277929 ||  || — || May 29, 2006 || Kitt Peak || Spacewatch || — || align=right | 3.6 km || 
|-id=930 bgcolor=#FA8072
| 277930 ||  || — || May 23, 2006 || Catalina || CSS || H || align=right data-sort-value="0.80" | 800 m || 
|-id=931 bgcolor=#d6d6d6
| 277931 ||  || — || May 31, 2006 || Kitt Peak || Spacewatch || — || align=right | 2.7 km || 
|-id=932 bgcolor=#d6d6d6
| 277932 ||  || — || May 22, 2006 || Kitt Peak || Spacewatch || VER || align=right | 3.2 km || 
|-id=933 bgcolor=#d6d6d6
| 277933 ||  || — || May 27, 2006 || Kitt Peak || Spacewatch || — || align=right | 3.8 km || 
|-id=934 bgcolor=#d6d6d6
| 277934 ||  || — || May 20, 2006 || Siding Spring || SSS || — || align=right | 4.3 km || 
|-id=935 bgcolor=#d6d6d6
| 277935 ||  || — || June 9, 2006 || Palomar || NEAT || — || align=right | 5.4 km || 
|-id=936 bgcolor=#d6d6d6
| 277936 || 2006 OO || — || July 18, 2006 || Ottmarsheim || C. Rinner || SAN || align=right | 2.1 km || 
|-id=937 bgcolor=#fefefe
| 277937 ||  || — || March 8, 2005 || Anderson Mesa || LONEOS || — || align=right | 1.1 km || 
|-id=938 bgcolor=#d6d6d6
| 277938 ||  || — || August 15, 2006 || Palomar || NEAT || — || align=right | 4.9 km || 
|-id=939 bgcolor=#d6d6d6
| 277939 ||  || — || August 13, 2006 || Palomar || NEAT || — || align=right | 4.6 km || 
|-id=940 bgcolor=#fefefe
| 277940 ||  || — || August 14, 2006 || Siding Spring || SSS || H || align=right data-sort-value="0.89" | 890 m || 
|-id=941 bgcolor=#d6d6d6
| 277941 ||  || — || August 13, 2006 || Siding Spring || SSS || THB || align=right | 5.8 km || 
|-id=942 bgcolor=#fefefe
| 277942 ||  || — || August 14, 2006 || Palomar || NEAT || — || align=right | 1.8 km || 
|-id=943 bgcolor=#E9E9E9
| 277943 ||  || — || August 16, 2006 || Siding Spring || SSS || — || align=right | 3.2 km || 
|-id=944 bgcolor=#fefefe
| 277944 ||  || — || August 16, 2006 || Siding Spring || SSS || V || align=right | 1.0 km || 
|-id=945 bgcolor=#d6d6d6
| 277945 ||  || — || August 16, 2006 || Reedy Creek || J. Broughton || — || align=right | 4.2 km || 
|-id=946 bgcolor=#d6d6d6
| 277946 ||  || — || August 22, 2006 || Palomar || NEAT || — || align=right | 4.0 km || 
|-id=947 bgcolor=#d6d6d6
| 277947 ||  || — || August 28, 2006 || Socorro || LINEAR || — || align=right | 5.2 km || 
|-id=948 bgcolor=#d6d6d6
| 277948 ||  || — || August 25, 2006 || Reedy Creek || J. Broughton || — || align=right | 5.3 km || 
|-id=949 bgcolor=#fefefe
| 277949 ||  || — || September 12, 2006 || Catalina || CSS || H || align=right data-sort-value="0.77" | 770 m || 
|-id=950 bgcolor=#fefefe
| 277950 ||  || — || September 14, 2006 || Kitt Peak || Spacewatch || — || align=right data-sort-value="0.72" | 720 m || 
|-id=951 bgcolor=#fefefe
| 277951 ||  || — || September 17, 2006 || Kitt Peak || Spacewatch || — || align=right data-sort-value="0.83" | 830 m || 
|-id=952 bgcolor=#E9E9E9
| 277952 ||  || — || September 17, 2006 || Kitt Peak || Spacewatch || — || align=right | 1.1 km || 
|-id=953 bgcolor=#d6d6d6
| 277953 ||  || — || September 16, 2006 || Catalina || CSS || 7:4 || align=right | 5.9 km || 
|-id=954 bgcolor=#d6d6d6
| 277954 ||  || — || September 17, 2006 || Kitt Peak || Spacewatch || IMH || align=right | 2.9 km || 
|-id=955 bgcolor=#E9E9E9
| 277955 ||  || — || September 19, 2006 || Kitt Peak || Spacewatch || KON || align=right | 2.8 km || 
|-id=956 bgcolor=#fefefe
| 277956 ||  || — || September 19, 2006 || Anderson Mesa || LONEOS || — || align=right data-sort-value="0.75" | 750 m || 
|-id=957 bgcolor=#fefefe
| 277957 ||  || — || September 18, 2006 || Catalina || CSS || — || align=right | 1.0 km || 
|-id=958 bgcolor=#FFC2E0
| 277958 ||  || — || September 26, 2006 || Kitt Peak || Spacewatch || APO +1km || align=right | 1.5 km || 
|-id=959 bgcolor=#E9E9E9
| 277959 ||  || — || September 25, 2006 || Mount Lemmon || Mount Lemmon Survey || — || align=right | 1.7 km || 
|-id=960 bgcolor=#E9E9E9
| 277960 ||  || — || September 26, 2006 || Catalina || CSS || — || align=right | 1.1 km || 
|-id=961 bgcolor=#fefefe
| 277961 ||  || — || September 27, 2006 || Mount Lemmon || Mount Lemmon Survey || MAS || align=right data-sort-value="0.79" | 790 m || 
|-id=962 bgcolor=#E9E9E9
| 277962 ||  || — || September 29, 2006 || Anderson Mesa || LONEOS || — || align=right | 1.0 km || 
|-id=963 bgcolor=#fefefe
| 277963 ||  || — || September 25, 2006 || Kitt Peak || Spacewatch || — || align=right data-sort-value="0.57" | 570 m || 
|-id=964 bgcolor=#E9E9E9
| 277964 ||  || — || September 27, 2006 || Mount Lemmon || Mount Lemmon Survey || — || align=right | 1.5 km || 
|-id=965 bgcolor=#fefefe
| 277965 ||  || — || September 27, 2006 || Kitt Peak || Spacewatch || — || align=right data-sort-value="0.82" | 820 m || 
|-id=966 bgcolor=#fefefe
| 277966 ||  || — || September 30, 2006 || Mount Lemmon || Mount Lemmon Survey || — || align=right data-sort-value="0.74" | 740 m || 
|-id=967 bgcolor=#fefefe
| 277967 ||  || — || September 16, 2006 || Catalina || CSS || — || align=right | 1.5 km || 
|-id=968 bgcolor=#E9E9E9
| 277968 ||  || — || September 30, 2006 || Apache Point || A. C. Becker || — || align=right | 2.3 km || 
|-id=969 bgcolor=#E9E9E9
| 277969 ||  || — || September 17, 2006 || Kitt Peak || Spacewatch || — || align=right | 1.3 km || 
|-id=970 bgcolor=#E9E9E9
| 277970 ||  || — || September 18, 2006 || Kitt Peak || Spacewatch || — || align=right | 1.0 km || 
|-id=971 bgcolor=#E9E9E9
| 277971 ||  || — || October 2, 2006 || Mount Lemmon || Mount Lemmon Survey || — || align=right | 1.0 km || 
|-id=972 bgcolor=#E9E9E9
| 277972 ||  || — || October 11, 2006 || Kitt Peak || Spacewatch || MIS || align=right | 2.4 km || 
|-id=973 bgcolor=#E9E9E9
| 277973 ||  || — || October 12, 2006 || Kitt Peak || Spacewatch || — || align=right | 2.1 km || 
|-id=974 bgcolor=#fefefe
| 277974 ||  || — || October 12, 2006 || Kitt Peak || Spacewatch || — || align=right data-sort-value="0.70" | 700 m || 
|-id=975 bgcolor=#E9E9E9
| 277975 ||  || — || October 12, 2006 || Kitt Peak || Spacewatch || — || align=right | 3.1 km || 
|-id=976 bgcolor=#E9E9E9
| 277976 ||  || — || October 12, 2006 || Kitt Peak || Spacewatch || — || align=right | 1.9 km || 
|-id=977 bgcolor=#E9E9E9
| 277977 ||  || — || October 12, 2006 || Kitt Peak || Spacewatch || — || align=right | 1.7 km || 
|-id=978 bgcolor=#E9E9E9
| 277978 ||  || — || October 12, 2006 || Palomar || NEAT || — || align=right | 1.1 km || 
|-id=979 bgcolor=#E9E9E9
| 277979 ||  || — || October 12, 2006 || Palomar || NEAT || RAF || align=right data-sort-value="0.98" | 980 m || 
|-id=980 bgcolor=#fefefe
| 277980 ||  || — || October 15, 2006 || Catalina || CSS || — || align=right data-sort-value="0.56" | 560 m || 
|-id=981 bgcolor=#E9E9E9
| 277981 ||  || — || October 11, 2006 || Palomar || NEAT || — || align=right | 1.5 km || 
|-id=982 bgcolor=#fefefe
| 277982 ||  || — || October 11, 2006 || Palomar || NEAT || — || align=right data-sort-value="0.81" | 810 m || 
|-id=983 bgcolor=#E9E9E9
| 277983 ||  || — || October 13, 2006 || Kitt Peak || Spacewatch || — || align=right | 1.0 km || 
|-id=984 bgcolor=#d6d6d6
| 277984 ||  || — || October 3, 2006 || Mount Lemmon || Mount Lemmon Survey || 3:2 || align=right | 6.5 km || 
|-id=985 bgcolor=#E9E9E9
| 277985 ||  || — || October 12, 2006 || Palomar || NEAT || — || align=right | 2.1 km || 
|-id=986 bgcolor=#E9E9E9
| 277986 ||  || — || October 3, 2006 || Apache Point || A. C. Becker || — || align=right | 1.3 km || 
|-id=987 bgcolor=#fefefe
| 277987 ||  || — || October 2, 2006 || Mount Lemmon || Mount Lemmon Survey || — || align=right data-sort-value="0.79" | 790 m || 
|-id=988 bgcolor=#E9E9E9
| 277988 ||  || — || October 16, 2006 || Catalina || CSS || — || align=right | 1.6 km || 
|-id=989 bgcolor=#E9E9E9
| 277989 ||  || — || October 16, 2006 || Catalina || CSS || — || align=right | 1.6 km || 
|-id=990 bgcolor=#fefefe
| 277990 ||  || — || October 16, 2006 || Catalina || CSS || — || align=right data-sort-value="0.95" | 950 m || 
|-id=991 bgcolor=#d6d6d6
| 277991 ||  || — || October 17, 2006 || Mount Lemmon || Mount Lemmon Survey || — || align=right | 4.6 km || 
|-id=992 bgcolor=#fefefe
| 277992 ||  || — || October 17, 2006 || Mount Lemmon || Mount Lemmon Survey || — || align=right data-sort-value="0.84" | 840 m || 
|-id=993 bgcolor=#fefefe
| 277993 ||  || — || October 16, 2006 || Kitt Peak || Spacewatch || — || align=right data-sort-value="0.82" | 820 m || 
|-id=994 bgcolor=#fefefe
| 277994 ||  || — || October 17, 2006 || Mount Lemmon || Mount Lemmon Survey || — || align=right data-sort-value="0.78" | 780 m || 
|-id=995 bgcolor=#E9E9E9
| 277995 ||  || — || October 17, 2006 || Kitt Peak || Spacewatch || — || align=right | 1.7 km || 
|-id=996 bgcolor=#E9E9E9
| 277996 ||  || — || October 17, 2006 || Kitt Peak || Spacewatch || — || align=right data-sort-value="0.91" | 910 m || 
|-id=997 bgcolor=#fefefe
| 277997 ||  || — || October 17, 2006 || Kitt Peak || Spacewatch || — || align=right data-sort-value="0.78" | 780 m || 
|-id=998 bgcolor=#fefefe
| 277998 ||  || — || January 13, 2004 || Kitt Peak || Spacewatch || — || align=right data-sort-value="0.68" | 680 m || 
|-id=999 bgcolor=#fefefe
| 277999 ||  || — || October 17, 2006 || Mount Lemmon || Mount Lemmon Survey || — || align=right data-sort-value="0.81" | 810 m || 
|-id=000 bgcolor=#fefefe
| 278000 ||  || — || October 17, 2006 || Kitt Peak || Spacewatch || — || align=right data-sort-value="0.69" | 690 m || 
|}

References

External links 
 Discovery Circumstances: Numbered Minor Planets (275001)–(280000) (IAU Minor Planet Center)

0277